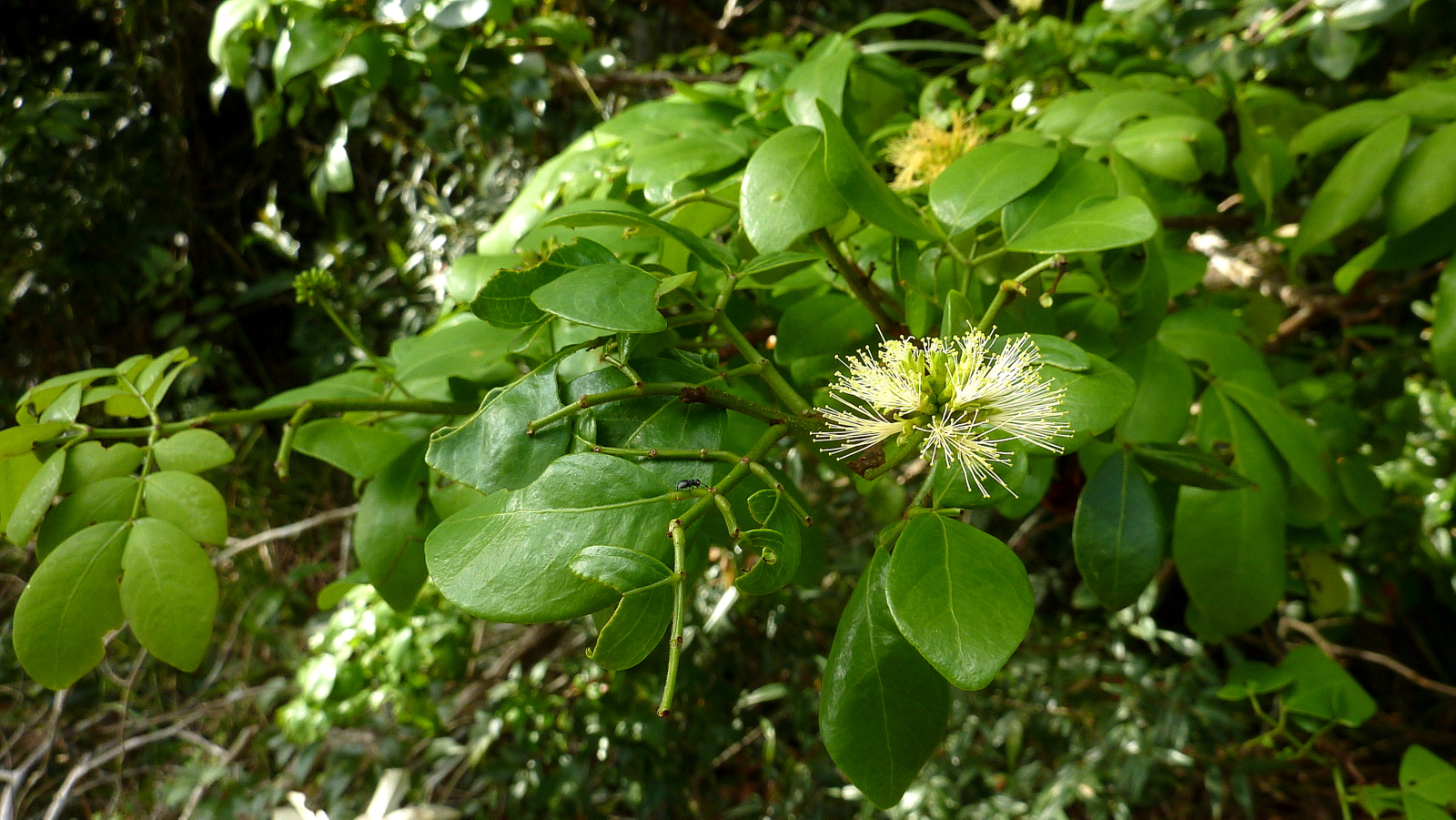
- Abarema cochliocarpos

Scientific classification
- Kingdom: Plantae
- Clade: Tracheophytes
- Clade: Angiosperms
- Clade: Eudicots
- Clade: Rosids
- Order: Fabales
- Family: Fabaceae
- Subfamily: Caesalpinioideae
- Clade: Mimosoid clade
- Genus: Abarema; Pittier

Species
- 3; see text

= Abarema =

Genus of legumes

Abarema is a neotropical genus in the family Fabaceae. It is native to Brazil and Venezuela. Most of the species can be found in the Amazon Basin and the Guyana Highlands. They have a deep-green fernlike foliage, with bipinnately compound leaves.

== Taxonomy ==
In older works, the entire genus is usually included within Pithecellobium. Following the 1996 revision, about 45 species were accepted. This genus has been proven to be polyphyletic under its previous circumscription. As a result of the genetic evidence, the genera Jupunba and Punjuba were separated from Abarema, and most of those species are now placed in Jupunba and Punjuba.

=== Species ===
Plants of the World Online currently accepts three species.

- Abarema cochliacarpos (Gomes) Barneby & J.W.Grimes – barbatimo: eastern Brazil
- Abarema diamantina E.Guerra, Iganci & M.P.Morim – northeastern Brazil (central Bahia)
- Abarema levelii (R.S.Cowan) Barneby & J.W.Grimes – southern Venezuela and northern Brazil

=== Status uncertain ===
- Abarema agropecuaria Barneby & J.W.Grimes (World Flora Online considers this an unplaced name)
- Abarema ricoae Barneby & J.W.Grimes, nom. inval. (World Flora Online considers this an unplaced name)

=== Formerly placed here ===
- Archidendron bigeminum (L.) I.C.Nielsen (as Abarema abeywickramae Kosterm., Abarema bigemina (L.) Kosterm., and Abarema monadelpha (Roxb.) Kosterm.)
- Archidendron grandiflorum (Benth.) I.C.Nielsen (as Abarema grandiflora (Benth.) Kosterm.)
- Archidendron hendersonii (F.Muell.) I.C.Nielsen (as Abarema hendersonii (F.Muell.) Kosterm.)
- Hydrochorea acreana (J.F.Macbr.) Barneby & J.W.Grimes (as Abarema acreana (J.F.Macbr.) L.Rico)
- Jupunba abbottii (Rose & Leonard) Britton & Rose (as Abarema abbottii (Rose & Leonard) Barneby & J.W.Grimes) – Abbott abarema
- Jupunba adenophora (Ducke) M.V.B.Soares, M.P.Morim & Iganci (as Abarema adenophora (Ducke) Barneby & J.W.Grimes)
- Jupunba alexandri (Urb.) Britton & Rose (as Abarema alexandri (Urb.) Barneby & J.W.Grimes)
- Jupunba asplenifolia (Griseb.) Britton & Rose (Abarema asplenifolia (Griseb.) Barneby & J.W.Grimes) – spleen-leaved abarema
- Jupunba auriculata (Benth.) M.V.B.Soares, M.P.Morim & Iganci (as Abarema auriculata (Benth.) Barneby & J.W.Grimes – guarango maní
- Jupunba barbouriana (Standl.) M.V.B.Soares, M.P.Morim & Iganci (synonym Abarema barbouriana (Standl.) Barneby & J.W.Grimes) – Barbour abarema
- Jupunba brachystachya (DC.) M.V.B.Soares, M.P.Morim & Iganci (as Abarema brachystachya (DC.) Barneby & J.W.Grimes and Abarema obovata (Benth.) Barneby & J.W.Grimes) – obovate abarema
- Jupunba campestris (Spruce ex Benth.) M.V.B.Soares, M.P.Morim & Iganci (as Abarema campestris (Spruce ex Benth.) Barneby & J.W.Grimes)
- Jupunba cochleata (Willd.) M.V.B.Soares, M.P.Morim & Iganci (as Abarema cochleata (Willd.) Barneby & J.W.Grimes)
  - Jupunba cochleata var. moniliformis (Barneby & J.W.Grimes) M.V.B.Soares, M.P.Morim & Iganci (as Abarema cochleata var. moniliformis (Barneby & J.W.Grimes) Barneby & J.W.Grimes and Abarema moniliformis Barneby & J.W.Grimes)
- Jupunba commutata (Barneby & J.W.Grimes) M.V.B.Soares, M.P.Morim & Iganci (as Abarema commutata Barneby & J.W.Grimes)
- Jupunba curvicarpa (H.S.Irwin) M.V.B.Soares, M.P.Morim & Iganci (as Abarema curvicarpa (H.S.Irwin) Barneby & J.W.Grimes)
  - Jupunba curvicarpa var. rodriguesii (Barneby & J.W.Grimes) M.V.B.Soares, M.P.Morim & Iganci as Abarema curvicarpa var. rodriguesii Barneby & J.W.Grimes)
- Jupunba ferruginea (Benth.) M.V.B.Soares, M.P.Morim & Iganci (as Abarema ferruginea (Benth.) Pittier)
- Jupunba filamentosa (Benth.) M.V.B.Soares, M.P.Morim & Iganci (Abarema filamentosa (Benth.) Pittier)
- Jupunba floribunda (Spruce ex Benth.) M.V.B.Soares, M.P.Morim & Iganci (as Abarema floribunda (Spruce ex Benth.) Barneby & J.W.Grimes)
- Jupunba gallorum (Barneby & J.W.Grimes) M.V.B.Soares, M.P.Morim & Iganci (as Abarema gallorum Barneby & J.W.Grimes)
- Jupunba ganymedea (Barneby & J.W.Grimes) M.V.B.Soares, M.P.Morim & Iganci (as Abarema ganymedea Barneby & J.W.Grimes)
- Jupunba glauca (Urb.) Britton & Rose (as Abarema glauca (Urb.) Barneby & J.W.Grimes)
- Jupunba idiopoda (S.F.Blake) M.V.B.Soares, M.P.Morim & Iganci (as Abarema idiopoda (S.F.Blake) Barneby & J.W.Grimes)
- Jupunba laeta (Benth.) M.V.B.Soares, M.P.Morim & Iganci (as Abarema laeta (Benth.) Barneby & J.W.Grimes)
- Jupunba langsdorffii (Benth.) M.V.B.Soares, M.P.Morim & Iganci (as Abarema langsdorffii (Benth.) Barneby & J.W.Grimes)
- Jupunba leucophylla (Spruce ex Benth.) M.V.B.Soares, M.P.Morim & Iganci (as Abarema leucophylla (Spruce ex Benth.) Barneby & J.W.Grimes)
  - Jupunba leucophylla var. vaupesensis (Barneby & J.W.Grimes) M.V.B.Soares, M.P.Morim & Iganci (as Abarema leucophylla var. vaupesensis Barneby & J.W.Grimes)
- Jupunba longipedunculata (H.S.Irwin) M.V.B.Soares, M.P.Morim & Iganci (Abarema longipedunculata (H.S.Irwin) Barneby & J.W.Grimes)
- Jupunba macradenia (Pittier) M.V.B.Soares, M.P.Morim & Iganci (as Abarema macradenia (Pittier) Barneby & J.W.Grimes) – Panama abarema
- Jupunba mataybifolia (Sandwith) M.V.B.Soares, M.P.Morim & Iganci (as Abarema mataybifolia (Sandwith) Barneby & J.W.Grimes)
- Jupunba microcalyx (Spruce ex Benth.) M.V.B.Soares, M.P.Morim & Iganci (as Abarema microcalyx (Spruce ex Benth.) Barneby & J.W.Grimes)
- Jupunba nipensis (Britton) Britton & Rose (as Abarema nipensis (Britton) Barneby & J.W.Grimes)
- Jupunba obovalis (A.Rich.) Britton & Rose (as Abarema obovalis (A.Rich.) Barneby & J.W.Grimes)
- Jupunba oppositifolia (Urb.) Britton & Rose (as Abarema oppositifolia (Urb.) Barneby & J.W.Grimes) – opposite-leaved abarema
- Jupunba oxyphyllidia (Barneby & J.W.Grimes) M.V.B.Soares, M.P.Morim & Iganci (as Abarema oxyphyllidia Barneby & J.W.Grimes)
- Jupunba piresii (Barneby & J.W.Grimes) M.V.B.Soares, M.P.Morim & Iganci (as Abarema piresii Barneby & J.W.Grimes)
- Jupunba trapezifolia (Vahl) Moldenke (as Abarema trapezifolia (Vahl) Pittier and Abarema jupunba var. trapezifolia (Vahl) Barneby & J.W.Grimes)
  - Jupunba trapezifolia var. micradenia (Benth.) M.V.B.Soares, M.P.Morim & Iganci (as Abarema jupunba (Willd.) Britton & Killip) – Delmare abarema, crabwood, dalmare, delmare, jumbie head, soapy-soapy; wild tamarin (Grenada, Saint Vincent and the Grenadines, tropical South America)
- Jupunba turbinata (Benth.) M.V.B.Soares, M.P.Morim & Iganci (as Abarema turbinata (Benth.) Barneby & J.W.Grimes)
- Jupunba villifera (Ducke) M.V.B.Soares, M.P.Morim & Iganci (as Abarema villifera (Ducke) Barneby & J.W.Grimes)
- Jupunba zolleriana (Standl. & Steyerm.) M.V.B.Soares, M.P.Morim & Iganci (as Abarema zolleriana (Standl. & Steyerm.) Barneby & J.W.Grimes)
- Punjuba callejasii (Barneby & J.W.Grimes) M.V.B.Soares, M.P.Morim & Iganci (as Abarema callejasii Barneby & J.W.Grimes)
- Punjuba centiflora (Barneby & J.W.Grimes) M.V.B.Soares, M.P.Morim & Iganci (as Abarema centiflora Barneby & J.W.Grimes)
- Punjuba josephi (Barneby & J.W.Grimes) M.V.B.Soares, M.P.Morim & Iganci as Abarema josephi Barneby & J.W.Grimes)
- Punjuba killipii Britton & Rose (as Abarema killipii (Britton & Rose) Barneby & J.W.Grimes)
- Punjuba lehmannii Britton & Rose (as Abarema lehmannii (Britton & Rose) Barneby & J.W.Grimes)
- Punjuba racemiflora (Donn.Sm.) Britton & Rose (as Abarema racemiflora (Donn.Sm.) Barneby & J.W.Grimes)
