= Villela Aribu =

Brazilian aircraft

Villela Airibu

General information
- Type: Experimental aircraft
- National origin: Brazil
- Designer: Marcos Villela
- Number built: 1

History
- First flight: 16 April 1917

The Villela Aribu (Brazilian-Portuguese typo name for the Black vulture bird) was a Brazilian single-engine, single-seat experimental aircraft.

== Design and development ==
It was designed by the then 1st Lieutenant of the Brazilian Army, to be a primary training and surveillance aircraft. The Aribu was a single-engine, high-wing monoplane, made of ingarana wood and canvas, with a French rotary engine and wooden propellers.

== Specifications ==
Data from Pereira 1986, p. 283

General characteristics

- Crew: One
- Length: 4.8 m (15 ft 9 in)
- Upper wingspan: 8.4 m (27 ft 7 in)
- Height: 2.4 m (7 ft 10 in)
- Powerplant: 1 × French motor 5-cylinder rotary engine, 37 kW (50 hp)
- Propellers: 2-bladed

Performance
