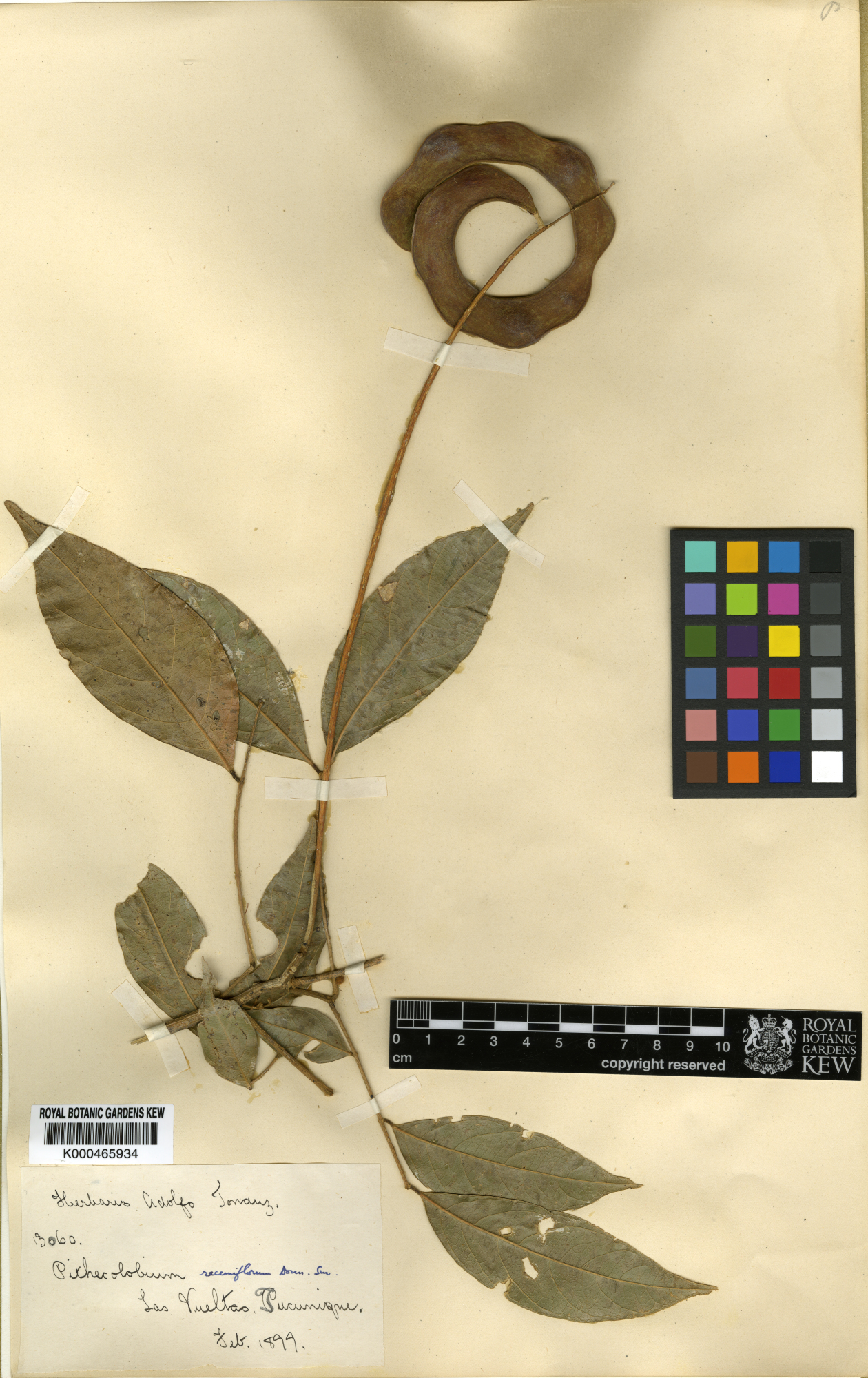
- Preserved Punjuba racemiflora (Donn.Sm.) Britton & Rose specimen

Scientific classification
- Kingdom: Plantae
- Clade: Tracheophytes
- Clade: Angiosperms
- Clade: Eudicots
- Clade: Rosids
- Order: Fabales
- Family: Fabaceae
- Subfamily: Caesalpinioideae
- Clade: Mimosoid clade
- Genus: Punjuba; Britton & Rose

Species
- 7 accepted species

Synonyms
- Punjuba does not have any synonyms

= Punjuba =

Genus of legumes

Punjuba is a genus in the family Fabaceae. It is native to Costa Rica as well as to western South America.

== Species ==
Punjuba has 7 accepted species:

- Punjuba callejasii (Barneby & J.W.Grimes) M.V.B.Soares, M.P.Morim & Iganci
- Punjuba centiflora (Barneby & J.W.Grimes) M.V.B.Soares, M.P.Morim & Iganci
- Punjuba foreroana Iganci, M.V.B.Soares & M.P.Morim
- Punjuba josephi (Barneby & J.W.Grimes) M.V.B.Soares, M.P.Morim & Iganci
- Punjuba killipii Britton & Rose
- Punjuba lehmannii Britton & Rose
- Punjuba racemiflora (Donn.Sm.) Britton & Rose

== Phylogeny ==
Punjuba is the sister group to the remaining genera of the Jupunba-Alliance (Jupunba, Balizia, Hydrochorea), as can be seen in the following cladogram:

- - Jupunba‑Alliance
    - - - Balizia
        - Hydrochorea
      - Jupunba
    - Punjuba
  - Inga-Alliance (including Abarema s.s.)
