= Jupunba curvicarpa var. rodriguesii =

Conservation status
- Vulnerable (IUCN 2.3)

Scientific classification
- Kingdom: Plantae
- Clade: Tracheophytes
- Clade: Angiosperms
- Clade: Eudicots
- Clade: Rosids
- Order: Fabales
- Family: Fabaceae
- Subfamily: Caesalpinioideae
- Clade: Mimosoid clade
- Genus: Jupunba
- Species: J. curvicarpa
- Variety: J. c. var. rodriguesii

Trinomial name
- Jupunba curvicarpa var. rodriguesii (Barneby & J.W.Grimes) M.V.B.Soares, M.P.Morim & Iganci

Synonyms
- Abarema curvicarpa var. rodriguesii Barneby & J.W.Grimes

Variety of legume

Jupunba curvicarpa var. rodriguesii is a vulnerable variety of legume. It is a tree known only from the Adolfo Ducke Forest Reserve near Manaus in Brazil, where it grows in Amazon rainforest.
