= Jupunba cochleata var. moniliformis =

Conservation status
- Vulnerable (IUCN 2.3)

Scientific classification
- Kingdom: Plantae
- Clade: Tracheophytes
- Clade: Angiosperms
- Clade: Eudicots
- Clade: Rosids
- Order: Fabales
- Family: Fabaceae
- Subfamily: Caesalpinioideae
- Clade: Mimosoid clade
- Genus: Jupunba
- Species: J. cochleata
- Variety: J. c. var. moniliformis

Trinomial name
- Jupunba cochleata var. moniliformis (Barneby & J.W.Grimes) M.V.B.Soares, M.P.Morim & Iganci

Synonyms
- Abarema cochleata var. moniliformis (Barneby & J.W.Grimes) Barneby & J.W.Grimes; Abarema moniliformis Barneby & J.W.Grimes; Pithecellobium moniliforme Ducke, nom. illeg.

Variety of legume

Jupunba cochleata var. moniliformis is a vulnerable variety of legume. It is a tree endemic to terre firme Amazon rainforest around Manaus in northern Brazil.
