= Jupunba leucophylla var. vaupesensis =

Conservation status
- Vulnerable (IUCN 2.3)

Scientific classification
- Kingdom: Plantae
- Clade: Tracheophytes
- Clade: Angiosperms
- Clade: Eudicots
- Clade: Rosids
- Order: Fabales
- Family: Fabaceae
- Subfamily: Caesalpinioideae
- Clade: Mimosoid clade
- Genus: Jupunba
- Species: J. leucophylla
- Variety: J. l. var. vaupesensis

Trinomial name
- Jupunba leucophylla var. vaupesensis (Barneby & J.W.Grimes) M.V.B.Soares, M.P.Morim & Iganci

Synonyms
- Abarema leucophylla var. vaupesensis Barneby & J.W.Grimes

Variety of legume

Jupunba leucophylla var. vaupesensis is a vulnerable variety of legume. It is a tree or shrub restricted to an area along the Vaupés River and Apaporís River in Vaupés Department, Colombia.
