= Macrosamanea macrocalyx =

Conservation status
- Vulnerable (IUCN 2.3)

Scientific classification
- Kingdom: Plantae
- Clade: Tracheophytes
- Clade: Angiosperms
- Clade: Eudicots
- Clade: Rosids
- Order: Fabales
- Family: Fabaceae
- Subfamily: Caesalpinioideae
- Clade: Mimosoid clade
- Genus: Macrosamanea
- Species: M. macrocalyx

Binomial name
- Macrosamanea macrocalyx (Ducke) Barneby & J.W.Grimes

Synonyms
- Pithecellobium macrocalyx Ducke

Species of legume

Macrosamanea macrocalyx is a species of flowering plant in the family Fabaceae. It is found only in Brazil.
