= Jupunba ganymedea =

Conservation status
- Least Concern (IUCN 3.1)

Scientific classification
- Kingdom: Plantae
- Clade: Tracheophytes
- Clade: Angiosperms
- Clade: Eudicots
- Clade: Rosids
- Order: Fabales
- Family: Fabaceae
- Subfamily: Caesalpinioideae
- Clade: Mimosoid clade
- Genus: Jupunba
- Species: J. ganymedea

Binomial name
- Jupunba ganymedea (Barneby & J.W.Grimes) M.V.B.Soares, M.P.Morim & Iganci

Synonyms
- Abarema ganymedea Barneby & J.W.Grimes

Species of legume

Jupunba ganymedea is a species of flowering plant in the family Fabaceae. It is a tree native to Colombia and Ecuador. It is native to the Pacific slope and lower Magdalena River valley of Colombia (Antioquia and Chocó departments) and to northwestern Ecuador, where it grows in lowland tropical moist forests (Chocó–Darién moist forests, Western Ecuador moist forests, and Magdalena-Urabá moist forests ecoregions) up to 600 (1000) meters elevation.
