= Jupunba floribunda =

Conservation status
- Least Concern (IUCN 3.1)

Scientific classification
- Kingdom: Plantae
- Clade: Tracheophytes
- Clade: Angiosperms
- Clade: Eudicots
- Clade: Rosids
- Order: Fabales
- Family: Fabaceae
- Subfamily: Caesalpinioideae
- Clade: Mimosoid clade
- Genus: Jupunba
- Species: J. floribunda

Binomial name
- Jupunba floribunda (Spruce ex Benth.) M.V.B.Soares, M.P.Morim & Iganci

Synonyms
- Abarema floribunda (Spruce ex Benth.) Barneby & J.W.Grimes; Feuilleea floribunda (Spruce ex Benth.) Kuntze; Pithecellobium floribundum Spruce ex Benth.

Species of legume

Jupunba floribunda is a species of plant of the genus Jupunba in the family Fabaceae. It is a tree native to Colombia, Ecuador, Peru, Venezuela, and northern Brazil, where it grows in lowland tropical moist forests. it has a wide distribution and large population, and is assessed by the IUCN as least concern.
