= Punjuba josephi =

Conservation status
- Near Threatened (IUCN 3.1)

Scientific classification
- Kingdom: Plantae
- Clade: Tracheophytes
- Clade: Angiosperms
- Clade: Eudicots
- Clade: Rosids
- Order: Fabales
- Family: Fabaceae
- Subfamily: Caesalpinioideae
- Clade: Mimosoid clade
- Genus: Punjuba
- Species: P. josephi

Binomial name
- Punjuba josephi (Barneby & J.W.Grimes) M.V.B.Soares, M.P.Morim & Iganci

Synonyms
- Abarema josephi Barneby & J.W.Grimes

Species of legume

Punjuba josephi is a species of plant in the family Fabaceae. It is known only from the type locality in Caquetá, Colombia.
