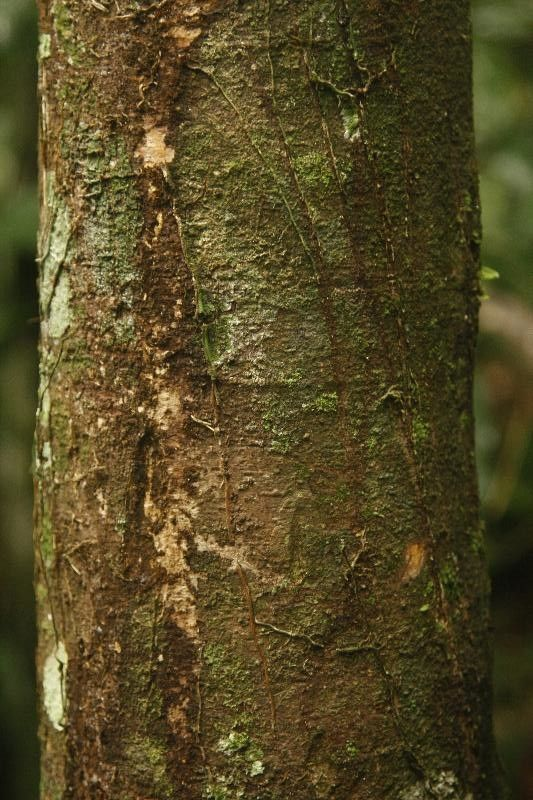

Scientific classification
- Kingdom: Plantae
- Clade: Embryophytes
- Clade: Tracheophytes
- Clade: Spermatophytes
- Clade: Angiosperms
- Clade: Eudicots
- Clade: Rosids
- Order: Fabales
- Family: Fabaceae
- Subfamily: Caesalpinioideae
- Clade: Mimosoid clade
- Genus: Jupunba
- Species: J. mataybifolia

Binomial name
- Jupunba mataybifolia (Sandwith) M.V.B.Soares, M.P.Morim & Iganci

Synonyms
- Abarema mataybifolia (Sandwith) Barneby & J.W.Grimes; Pithecellobium mataybifolium Sandwith

= Jupunba mataybifolia =

Species of flowering plant

Jupunba mataybifolia is a species of flowering plant of the genus Jupunba in the family Fabaceae. It is a tree native to the Guianas (Guyana, Suriname, and French Guiana) and northern Brazil, where it grows in tropical moist forest.
