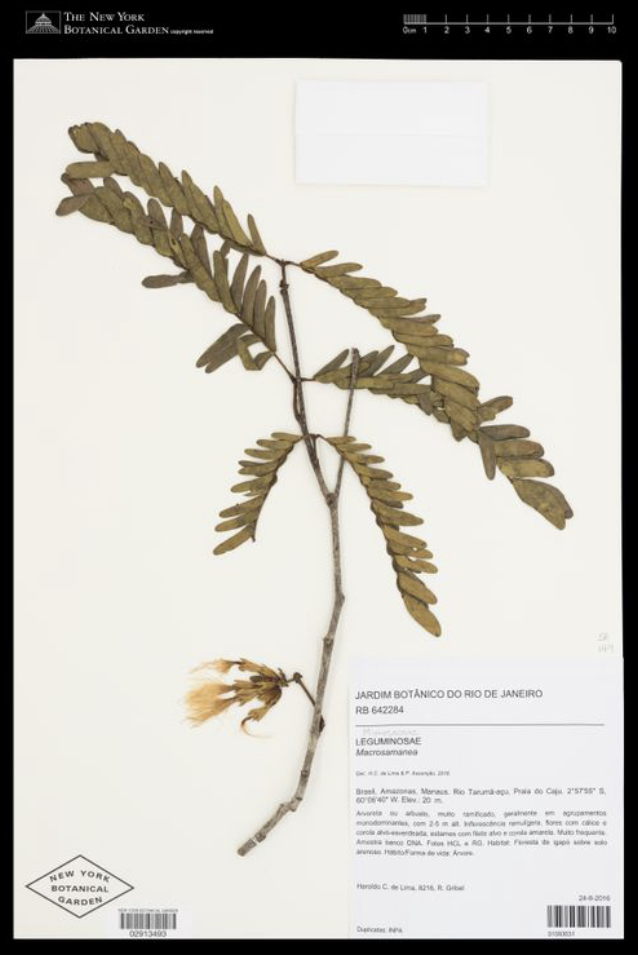

Scientific classification
- Kingdom: Plantae
- Clade: Embryophytes
- Clade: Tracheophytes
- Clade: Spermatophytes
- Clade: Angiosperms
- Clade: Eudicots
- Clade: Rosids
- Order: Fabales
- Family: Fabaceae
- Subfamily: Caesalpinioideae
- Clade: Mimosoid clade
- Genus: Macrosamanea; Britton & Rose (1936)

Species
- 11; see text

= Macrosamanea =

Genus of legumes

Macrosamanea is a genus of flowering plant in the legume family, Fabaceae. It includes 11 species of trees and shrubs native to northern South America. The genus is most diverse and numerous in the Amazon Basin, extending into the Orinoco basin and the Guianas. Typical habitat is tropical rain forest, mostly riparian and seasonally-flooded. Two species are native to seasonally-inundated wooded grassland (savanna) on sandy soils. The genus belongs to the mimosoid clade of the subfamily Caesalpinioideae.

== Species ==
Macrosamanea includes the following species:

- Macrosamanea amplissima (Ducke) Barneby & J.W.Grimes
- Macrosamanea consanguinea (R.S.Cowan) Barneby & J.W.Grimes
- Macrosamanea discolor (Humb. & Bonpl. ex Willd.) Britton & Rose
- Macrosamanea duckei (Huber) Barneby & J.W.Grimes
- Macrosamanea froesii Barneby & J.W.Grimes
- Macrosamanea kegelii (Meisn.) Kleinhoonte
- Macrosamanea macrocalyx (Ducke) Barneby & J.W.Grimes
- Macrosamanea prancei (Barneby) Barneby & J.W.Grimes
- Macrosamanea pubiramea (Steud.) Barneby & J.W.Grimes
- Macrosamanea simabifolia (Spruce ex Benth.) Pittier
- Macrosamanea spruceana (Benth.) Killip ex Record
