= Jupunba idiopoda =

Conservation status
- Least Concern (IUCN 3.1)

Scientific classification
- Kingdom: Plantae
- Clade: Tracheophytes
- Clade: Angiosperms
- Clade: Eudicots
- Clade: Rosids
- Order: Fabales
- Family: Fabaceae
- Subfamily: Caesalpinioideae
- Clade: Mimosoid clade
- Genus: Jupunba
- Species: J. idiopoda

Binomial name
- Jupunba idiopoda (S.F.Blake) M.V.B.Soares, M.P.Morim & Iganci

Synonyms
- Abarema idiopoda (S.F.Blake) Barneby & J.W.Grimes; Albizia idiopoda (S.F.Blake) Britton & Rose; Jupunba pseudotamarindus Britton; Pithecellobium halogenes Standl.; Pithecellobium idiopodum S.F.Blake; Pithecellobium pseudotamarindus (Britton) Standl.

Species of legume

Jupunba idiopoda is a species of plant of the genus Jupunba in the family Fabaceae. It is a tree native to Central America and southern Mexico, where it grows in lowland tropical moist forests. The species has a wide distribution and large population which is considered to be stable, so it is assessed as least concern by the IUCN.
