= Punjuba foreroana =

Scientific classification
- Kingdom: Plantae
- Clade: Tracheophytes
- Clade: Angiosperms
- Clade: Eudicots
- Clade: Rosids
- Order: Fabales
- Family: Fabaceae
- Subfamily: Caesalpinioideae
- Clade: Mimosoid clade
- Genus: Punjuba
- Species: P. foreroana

Binomial name
- Punjuba foreroana Iganci, M.V.B.Soares & M.P.Morim

Species of flowering plant

Punjuba foreroana is a species of flowering plant in the pea family, Fabaceae. It is a tree endemic to Colombia.
