= Jupunba villifera =

Conservation status
- Near Threatened (IUCN 2.3)

Scientific classification
- Kingdom: Plantae
- Clade: Tracheophytes
- Clade: Angiosperms
- Clade: Eudicots
- Clade: Rosids
- Order: Fabales
- Family: Fabaceae
- Subfamily: Caesalpinioideae
- Clade: Mimosoid clade
- Genus: Jupunba
- Species: J. villifera

Binomial name
- Jupunba villifera (Ducke) M.V.B.Soares, M.P.Morim & Iganci

Synonyms
- Abarema villifera (Ducke) Barneby & J.W.Grimes; Pithecellobium villiferum Ducke

Species of legume

Jupunba villifera is a species of plant in the family Fabaceae. It native to the upper Rio Negro basin of southern Venezuela and northern Brazil and to Suriname, where it grows in periodically inundated tropical rain forest.
