= Jupunba curvicarpa =

Conservation status
- Least Concern (IUCN 3.1)

Scientific classification
- Kingdom: Plantae
- Clade: Tracheophytes
- Clade: Angiosperms
- Clade: Eudicots
- Clade: Rosids
- Order: Fabales
- Family: Fabaceae
- Subfamily: Caesalpinioideae
- Clade: Mimosoid clade
- Genus: Jupunba
- Species: J. curvicarpa

Binomial name
- Jupunba curvicarpa (H.S.Irwin) M.V.B.Soares, M.P.Morim & Iganci

Varieties
- Jupunba curvicarpa var. curvicarpa; Jupunba curvicarpa var. rodriguesii (Barneby & J.W.Grimes) M.V.B.Soares, M.P.Morim & Iganci

Synonyms
- Abarema curvicarpa (H.S.Irwin) Barneby & J.W.Grimes; Pithecellobium curvicarpum H.S.Irwin

Species of legume

Jupunba curvicarpa, commonly known as orelha de negro, is a species of flowering plant of the genus Jupunba in the family Fabaceae. It is a tree native northern and northeastern Brazil, French Guiana, and Guyana. It grows in lowland tropical rainforest, including non-flooded (terre firme) forest, mixed forest, on river banks, and near swamps. It range includes the Guianan moist forests, Guianan freshwater swamp forests, Uatuma–Trombetas moist forests, Marajó várzea forests, and Amazon–Orinoco–Southern Caribbean mangroves ecoregions.

Two species are accepted.

- Jupunba curvicarpa var. curvicarpa – northern and northeastern Brazil, French Guiana, and Guyana
- Jupunba curvicarpa var. rodriguesii (Barneby & J.W.Grimes) M.V.B.Soares, M.P.Morim & Iganci – Northern Brazil
