= Jupunba macradenia =

Conservation status
- Least Concern (IUCN 3.1)

Scientific classification
- Kingdom: Plantae
- Clade: Tracheophytes
- Clade: Angiosperms
- Clade: Eudicots
- Clade: Rosids
- Order: Fabales
- Family: Fabaceae
- Subfamily: Caesalpinioideae
- Clade: Mimosoid clade
- Genus: Jupunba
- Species: J. macradenia

Binomial name
- Jupunba macradenia (Pittier) M.V.B.Soares, M.P.Morim & Iganci

Synonyms
- Abarema macradenia (Pittier) Barneby & J.W.Grimes; Pithecellobium macradenium Pittier; Samanea macradenia (Pittier) Britton & Rose

Species of legume

Jupunba macradenia is a species of plant of the genus Jupunba in the family Fabaceae. Common names include bantano, coralillo, guavo, and guavo de montana. It is a tree native to southeastern Mexico, Belize, Nicaragua, Costa Rica, Panama, Colombia, and Ecuador, where it grows in lowland tropical moist forests. In Colombia it grows in the Pacific (Chocó–Darién moist forests ecoregion) and Andean (Cauca Valley montane forests ecoregion) regions, from sea level to 1,500 meters elevation. The species has a broad range and large population, and is assessed as least concern by the IUCN.
