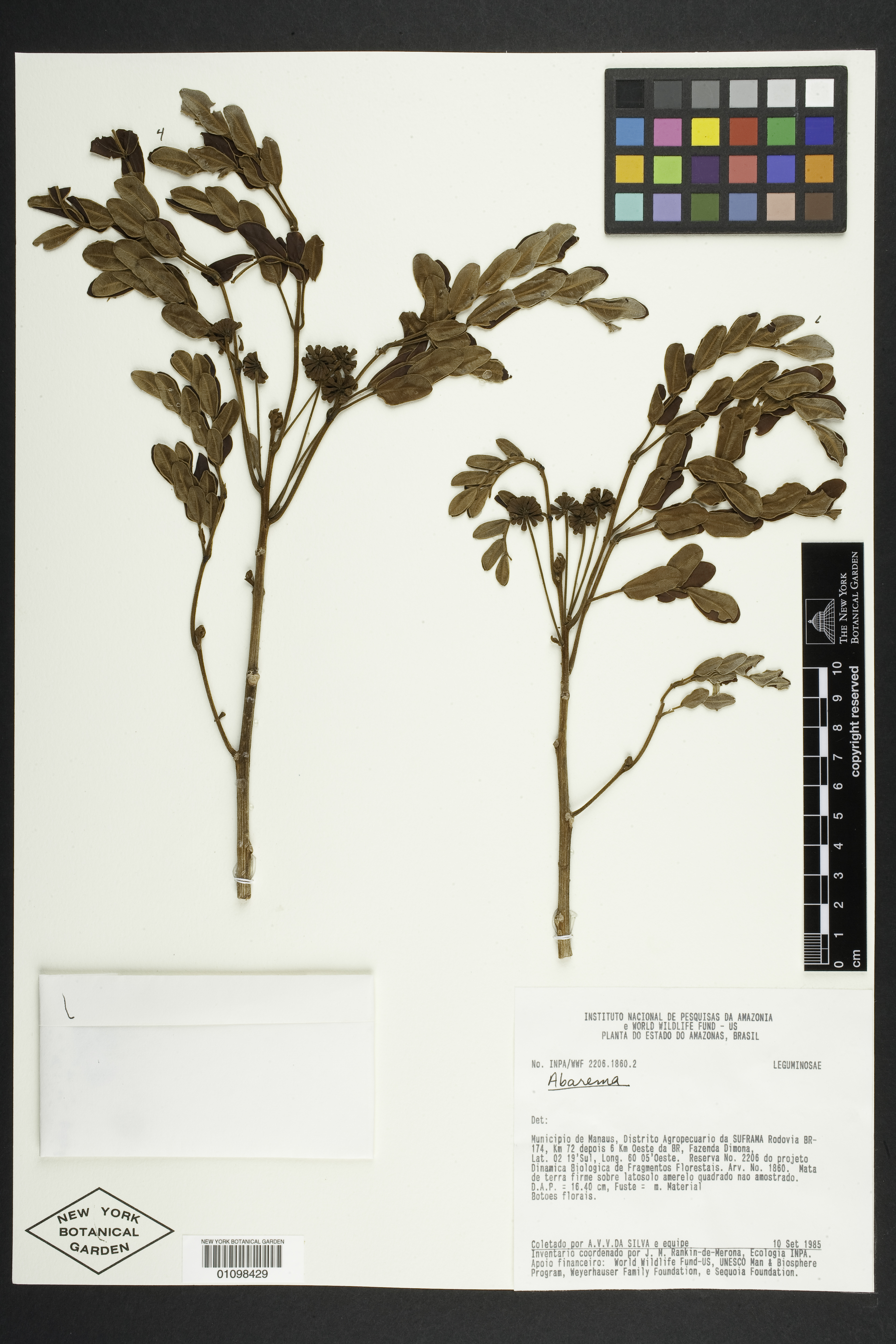

Scientific classification
- Kingdom: Plantae
- Clade: Tracheophytes
- Clade: Angiosperms
- Clade: Eudicots
- Clade: Rosids
- Order: Fabales
- Family: Fabaceae
- Subfamily: Caesalpinioideae
- Clade: Mimosoid clade
- Genus: Abarema
- Species: A. agropecuaria

Binomial name
- Abarema agropecuaria Barneby & J.W.Grimes

= Abarema agropecuaria =

Species of legume

Abarema agropecuaria is a species of plant of the genus Abarema in the family Fabaceae.
