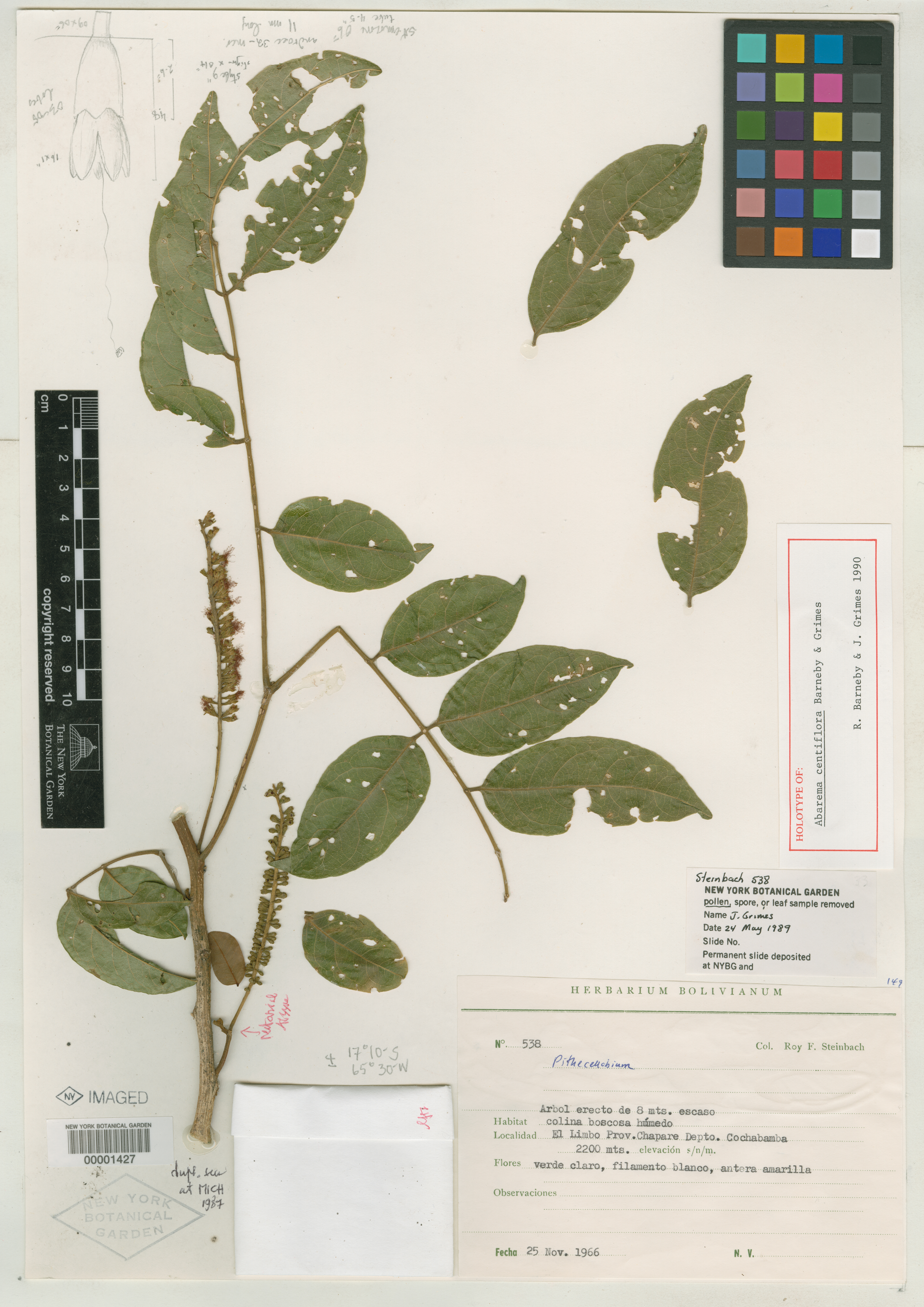

Conservation status
- Vulnerable (IUCN 2.3)

Scientific classification
- Kingdom: Plantae
- Clade: Tracheophytes
- Clade: Angiosperms
- Clade: Eudicots
- Clade: Rosids
- Order: Fabales
- Family: Fabaceae
- Subfamily: Caesalpinioideae
- Clade: Mimosoid clade
- Genus: Punjuba
- Species: P. centiflora

Binomial name
- Punjuba centiflora (Barneby & J.W.Grimes) M.V.B.Soares, M.P.Morim & Iganci

Synonyms
- Abarema centiflora Barneby & J.W.Grimes

= Punjuba centiflora =

Species of legume

Punjuba centiflora is a species of plant in the family Fabaceae. It is endemic to the east slope of the Bolivian Andes. It is a small tree found in humid montane forests.

== Taxonomy ==
The species was first described as Abarema centiflora by Barneby and J. W. Grimes. and first published in Memoirs of The New York Botanical Garden 74(1): 105. 1996. In 2021 it was placed in the revived genus Punjuba as Punjuba centiflora.

== Description ==
The trees reach up to 8 meters in height, with furrowed branchlets. The foliage is bright green in color. The dense racemes have small greenish or whitish flowers. Which are paired to a branch bud. The peduncles are between 1.5 and 4 centimeters in length. There are no pods on the plant.
