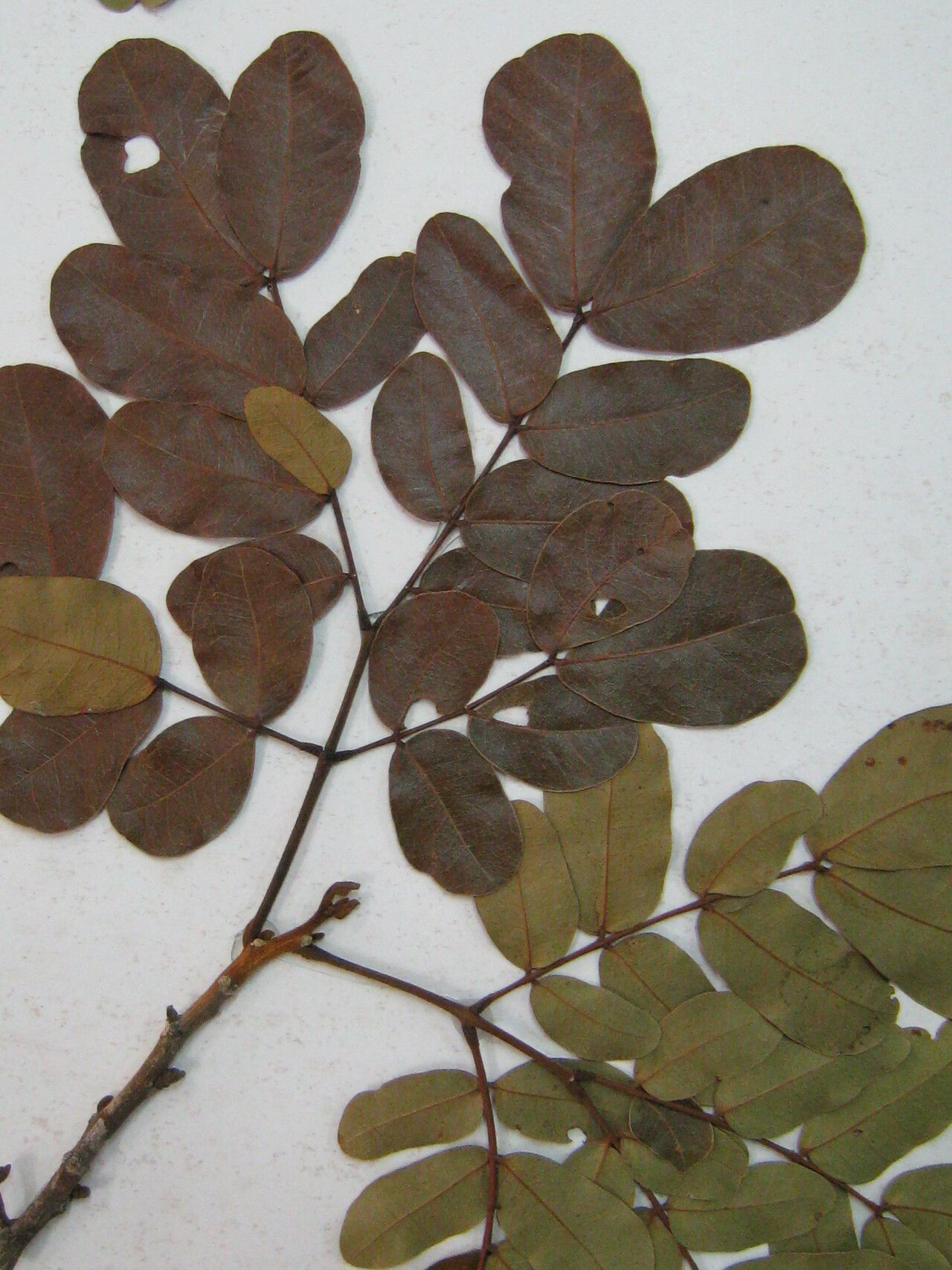

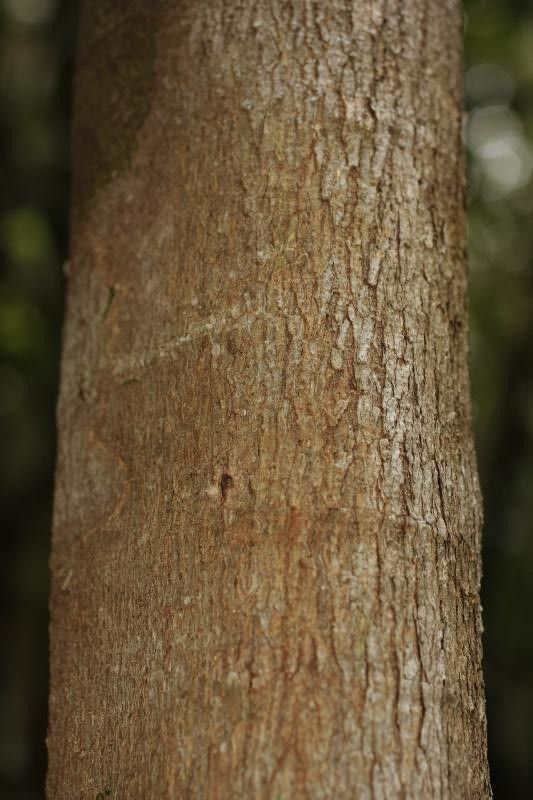

Scientific classification
- Kingdom: Plantae
- Clade: Tracheophytes
- Clade: Angiosperms
- Clade: Eudicots
- Clade: Rosids
- Order: Fabales
- Family: Fabaceae
- Subfamily: Caesalpinioideae
- Clade: Mimosoid clade
- Genus: Jupunba
- Species: J. gallorum

Binomial name
- Jupunba gallorum (Barneby & J.W.Grimes) M.V.B.Soares, M.P.Morim & Iganci

Synonyms
- Abarema gallorum Barneby & J.W.Grimes

= Jupunba gallorum =

Species of legume

Jupunba gallorum is a species of flowering plant of the genus Jupunba in the family Fabaceae. It is a tree endemic to French Guiana.
