= Jupunba commutata =

Conservation status
- Least Concern (IUCN 3.1)

Scientific classification
- Kingdom: Plantae
- Clade: Tracheophytes
- Clade: Angiosperms
- Clade: Eudicots
- Clade: Rosids
- Order: Fabales
- Family: Fabaceae
- Subfamily: Caesalpinioideae
- Clade: Mimosoid clade
- Genus: Jupunba
- Species: J. commutata

Binomial name
- Jupunba commutata (Barneby & J.W.Grimes) M.V.B.Soares, M.P.Morim & Iganci

Synonyms
- Abarema commutata Barneby & J.W.Grimes

Species of legume

Jupunba commutata is a species of flowering plant in the family Fabaceae. It is a tree native to Guyana, Suriname, and Venezuela. It is confined to a small number of localities including the Gran Sabana, the Pacaraima Mountains, the Kanuku Mountains, and Tafelberg, where it grows in the montane savanna–forest transition, including shrublands and gallery forests, from 800 to 1200 meters elevation.
