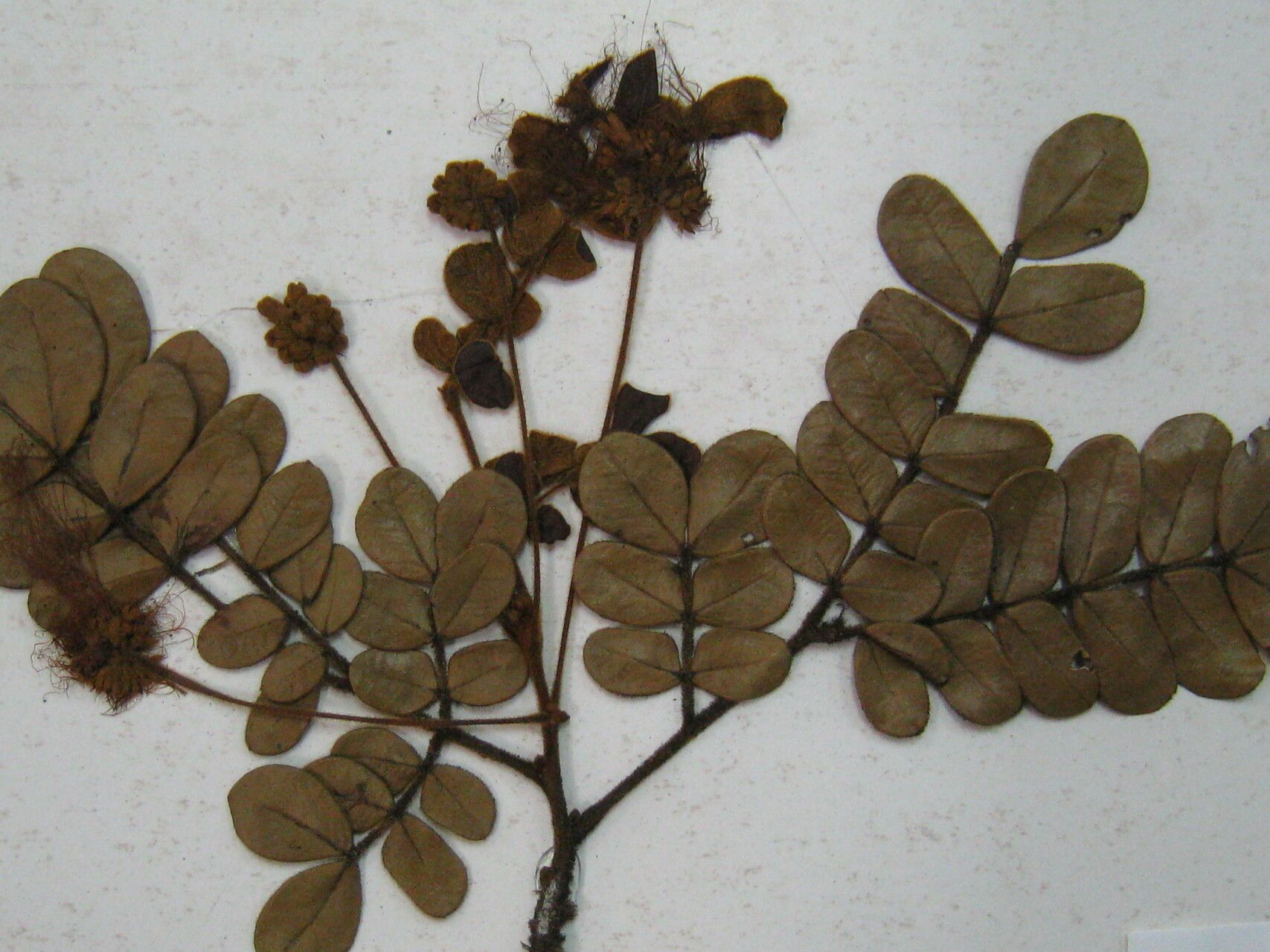

Scientific classification
- Kingdom: Plantae
- Clade: Tracheophytes
- Clade: Angiosperms
- Clade: Eudicots
- Clade: Rosids
- Order: Fabales
- Family: Fabaceae
- Subfamily: Caesalpinioideae
- Clade: Mimosoid clade
- Genus: Jupunba
- Species: J. ferruginea

Binomial name
- Jupunba ferruginea (Benth.) M.V.B.Soares, M.P.Morim & Iganci

Synonyms
- Abarema ferruginea (Benth.) Pittier; Feuilleea fulvescens Kuntze; Pithecellobium ferrugineum Benth.

= Jupunba ferruginea =

Species of legume

Jupunba ferruginea is a species of plant of the genus Abarema in the family Fabaceae. It is a shrub or tree native to the tepuis Mount Roraima in southeastern Venezuela and Serra do Sol in northern Brazil.
