= Jupunba oxyphyllidia =

Conservation status
- Critically Endangered (IUCN 3.1)

Scientific classification
- Kingdom: Plantae
- Clade: Tracheophytes
- Clade: Angiosperms
- Clade: Eudicots
- Clade: Rosids
- Order: Fabales
- Family: Fabaceae
- Subfamily: Caesalpinioideae
- Clade: Mimosoid clade
- Genus: Jupunba
- Species: J. oxyphyllidia

Binomial name
- Jupunba oxyphyllidia (Barneby & J.W.Grimes) M.V.B.Soares, M.P.Morim & Iganci

Synonyms
- Abarema oxyphyllidia Barneby & J.W.Grimes

Species of legume

Jupunba oxyphyllidia is a species of plant in the family Fabaceae. It is a tree which grows up to 20 meters tall. It is endemic to central Honduras, where it grows in humid montane primary forests, including cloud forests, at approximately 1,900 to 2100 meters elevation. The species is rare with a limited range, and it is subject to habitat loss and fragmentation. It is assessed as critically endangered by the IUCN.
