= Jupunba auriculata =

Scientific classification
- Kingdom: Plantae
- Clade: Tracheophytes
- Clade: Angiosperms
- Clade: Eudicots
- Clade: Rosids
- Order: Fabales
- Family: Fabaceae
- Subfamily: Caesalpinioideae
- Clade: Mimosoid clade
- Genus: Jupunba
- Species: J. auriculata

Binomial name
- Jupunba auriculata (Benth.) M.V.B.Soares, M.P.Morim & Iganci

Synonyms
- Abarema auriculata (Benth.) Barneby & J.W.Grimes; Feuilleea auriculata (Benth.) Kuntze; Pithecellobium auriculatum Benth.

Species of legume

Jupunba auriculata is a species of plant of the genus Abarema in the family Fabaceae. It is a tree native to the Amazon Basin of Colombia, Peru, and northern Brazil.
