= Jupunba piresii =

Scientific classification
- Kingdom: Plantae
- Clade: Tracheophytes
- Clade: Angiosperms
- Clade: Eudicots
- Clade: Rosids
- Order: Fabales
- Family: Fabaceae
- Subfamily: Caesalpinioideae
- Clade: Mimosoid clade
- Genus: Jupunba
- Species: J. piresii

Binomial name
- Jupunba piresii (Barneby & J.W.Grimes) M.V.B.Soares, M.P.Morim & Iganci

Synonyms
- Abarema piresii Barneby & J.W.Grimes

Species of legume

Jupunba piresii is a species of plant of the genus Jupunba in the family Fabaceae. The species is native to northern Brazil, including the state of Pará and ranging south to northern Mato Grosso. It was first published by Rupert Charles Barneby and James Walter Grimes in Acta Amazonica 14(1/2): 96, fig. 1. 1984[1986].
