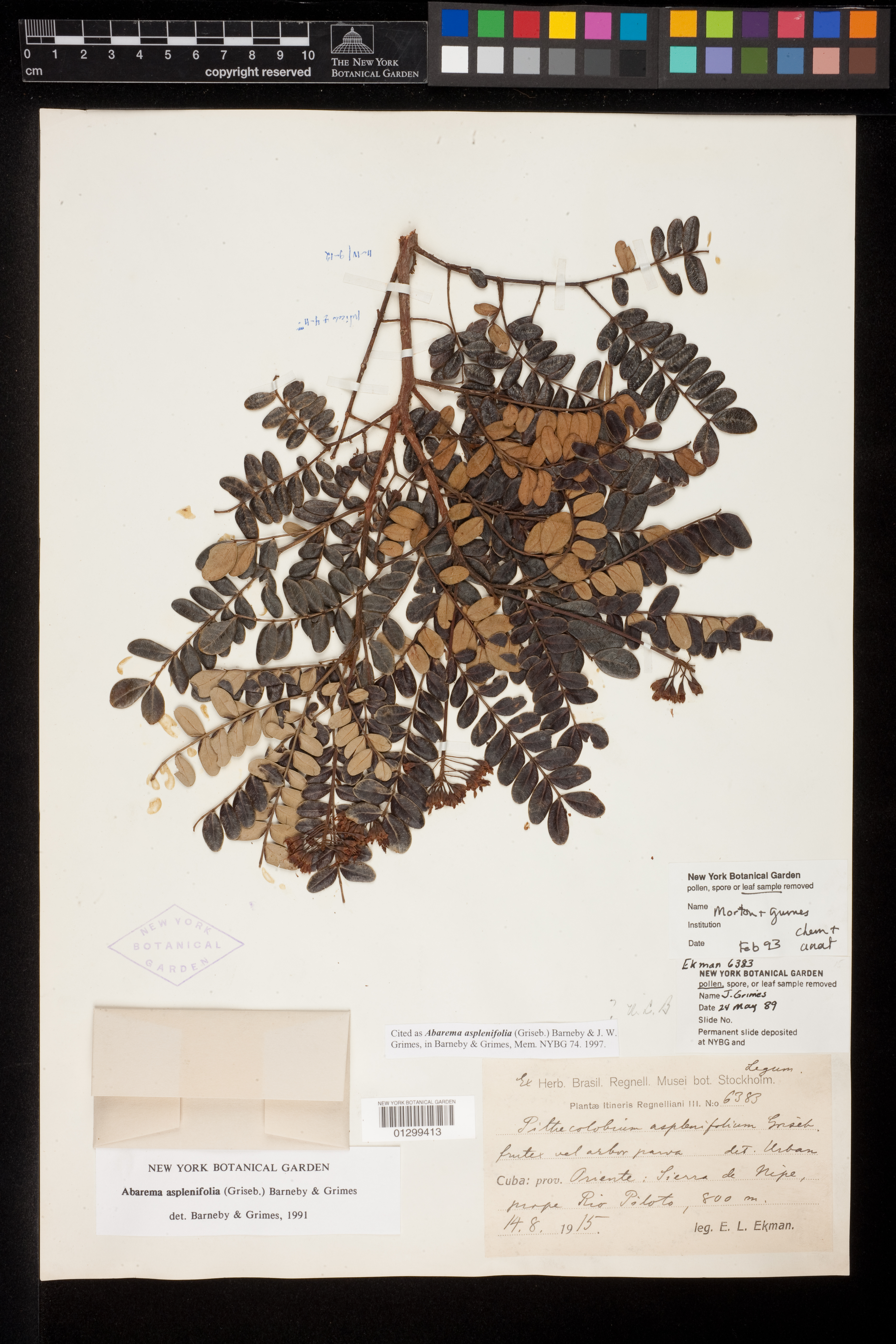

Scientific classification
- Kingdom: Plantae
- Clade: Tracheophytes
- Clade: Angiosperms
- Clade: Eudicots
- Clade: Rosids
- Order: Fabales
- Family: Fabaceae
- Subfamily: Caesalpinioideae
- Clade: Mimosoid clade
- Genus: Jupunba
- Species: J. asplenifolia

Binomial name
- Jupunba asplenifolia (Griseb.) Britton & Rose (1928)

Synonyms
- Abarema asplenifolia (Griseb.) Barneby & J.W.Grimes (1996); Feuilleea asplenifolia (Griseb.) Kuntze (1891); Pithecellobium asplenifolium Griseb. (1866); Pithecellobium asplenifolium subsp. mayarense Borhidi (1976 publ. 1977)

= Jupunba asplenifolia =

Species of legume

Jupunba asplenifolia is a species of flowering plant of the genus Jupunba in the family Fabaceae. It is a tree endemic to Cuba.
