= Abarema ricoae =

Scientific classification
- Kingdom: Plantae
- Clade: Tracheophytes
- Clade: Angiosperms
- Clade: Eudicots
- Clade: Rosids
- Order: Fabales
- Family: Fabaceae
- Subfamily: Caesalpinioideae
- Clade: Mimosoid clade
- Genus: Abarema
- Species: A. ricoae

Binomial name
- Abarema ricoae Barneby & J.W.Grimes

Species of legume

Abarema ricoae is a species of plant of the genus Abarema in the family Fabaceae.
