= Macrosamanea prancei =

Conservation status
- Data Deficient (IUCN 3.1)

Scientific classification
- Kingdom: Plantae
- Clade: Tracheophytes
- Clade: Angiosperms
- Clade: Eudicots
- Clade: Rosids
- Order: Fabales
- Family: Fabaceae
- Subfamily: Caesalpinioideae
- Clade: Mimosoid clade
- Genus: Macrosamanea
- Species: M. prancei

Binomial name
- Macrosamanea prancei (Barneby) Barneby & J.W.Grimes

Species of legume

Macrosamanea prancei is a species of flowering plant in the family Fabaceae. It is found only in Brazil.
