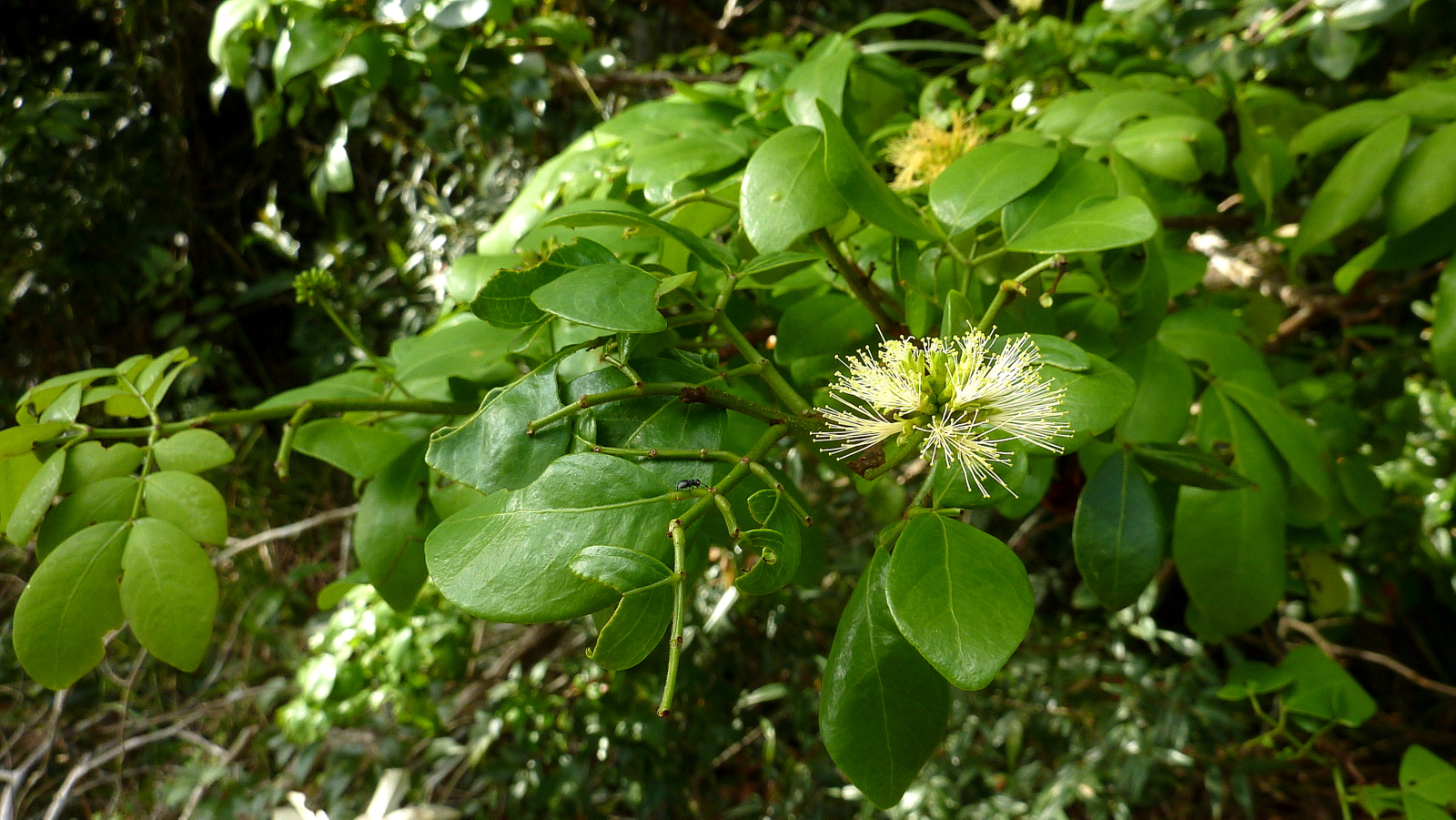

Conservation status
- Least Concern (IUCN 3.1)

Scientific classification
- Kingdom: Plantae
- Clade: Tracheophytes
- Clade: Angiosperms
- Clade: Eudicots
- Clade: Rosids
- Order: Fabales
- Family: Fabaceae
- Subfamily: Caesalpinioideae
- Clade: Mimosoid clade
- Genus: Abarema
- Species: A. cochliocarpos

Binomial name
- Abarema cochliocarpos (Gomes) Barneby & J.W.Grimes

Synonyms
- Inga nandinaefolia Mimosa cochliocarpos Mimosa vago Pithecellobium avaremotemo Pithecolobium cochliocarpum

= Abarema cochliocarpos =

Species of legume

Abarema cochliocarpos is a species of tree in the legume family, Fabaceae. Its common name is barbatimão. It is endemic to Brazil, where it occurs in Alagoas, Bahia, Paraíba, Pernambuco, Rio de Janeiro, Rio Grande do Norte and São Paulo.

There is a coastal form and an inland form of this species. The coastal form can exceed 10 meters in height. The inland form is up to 4 meters tall and has smaller leaflets which are tougher in texture. In coastal areas this tree grows in woodland habitat on sandy substrates. Inland it can be found in scrub, savanna, and disturbed habitat types.

Threats to the species include habitat loss to agriculture and open-pit iron mining; however, the tree occurs in several protected areas and it is relatively widespread.

Extracts of the bark of this native plant is used in Brazilian traditional medicine as an antiseptic, antiinflammatory, and painkiller, and to treat wounds.
