= Jupunba nipensis =

Scientific classification
- Kingdom: Plantae
- Clade: Tracheophytes
- Clade: Angiosperms
- Clade: Eudicots
- Clade: Rosids
- Order: Fabales
- Family: Fabaceae
- Subfamily: Caesalpinioideae
- Clade: Mimosoid clade
- Genus: Jupunba
- Species: J. nipensis

Binomial name
- Jupunba nipensis (Britton) Britton & Rose

Synonyms
- Abarema nipensis (Britton) Barneby & J.W.Grimes; Pithecellobium nipense Britton

Species of legume

Jupunba nipensis is a species of flowering plant of the genus Jupunba in the family Fabaceae. It is a tree or shrub endemic to eastern Cuba.
