= Jupunba obovalis =

Scientific classification
- Kingdom: Plantae
- Clade: Tracheophytes
- Clade: Angiosperms
- Clade: Eudicots
- Clade: Rosids
- Order: Fabales
- Family: Fabaceae
- Subfamily: Caesalpinioideae
- Clade: Mimosoid clade
- Genus: Jupunba
- Species: J. obovalis

Binomial name
- Jupunba obovalis (A.Rich.) Britton & Rose (1928)

Synonyms
- Abarema obovalis (A.Rich.) Barneby & J.W.Grimes (1996); Calliandra revoluta Griseb. (1866); Feuilleea obovalis (A.Rich.) Kuntze (1891); Inga obovalis A.Rich. (1845); Jupunba pinetorum (Britton) Britton & Rose (1928); Jupunba truncata (Britton) Britton & Rose (1928); Pithecellobium obovale (A.Rich.) C.Wright (1869); Pithecellobium pinetorum Britton (1914); Pithecellobium truncatum Britton (1914)

Species of legume

Jupunba obovalis is a species of plant of the genus Jupunba in the family Fabaceae. It is a tree native to Cuba and Hispaniola (Haiti and the Dominican Republic).
