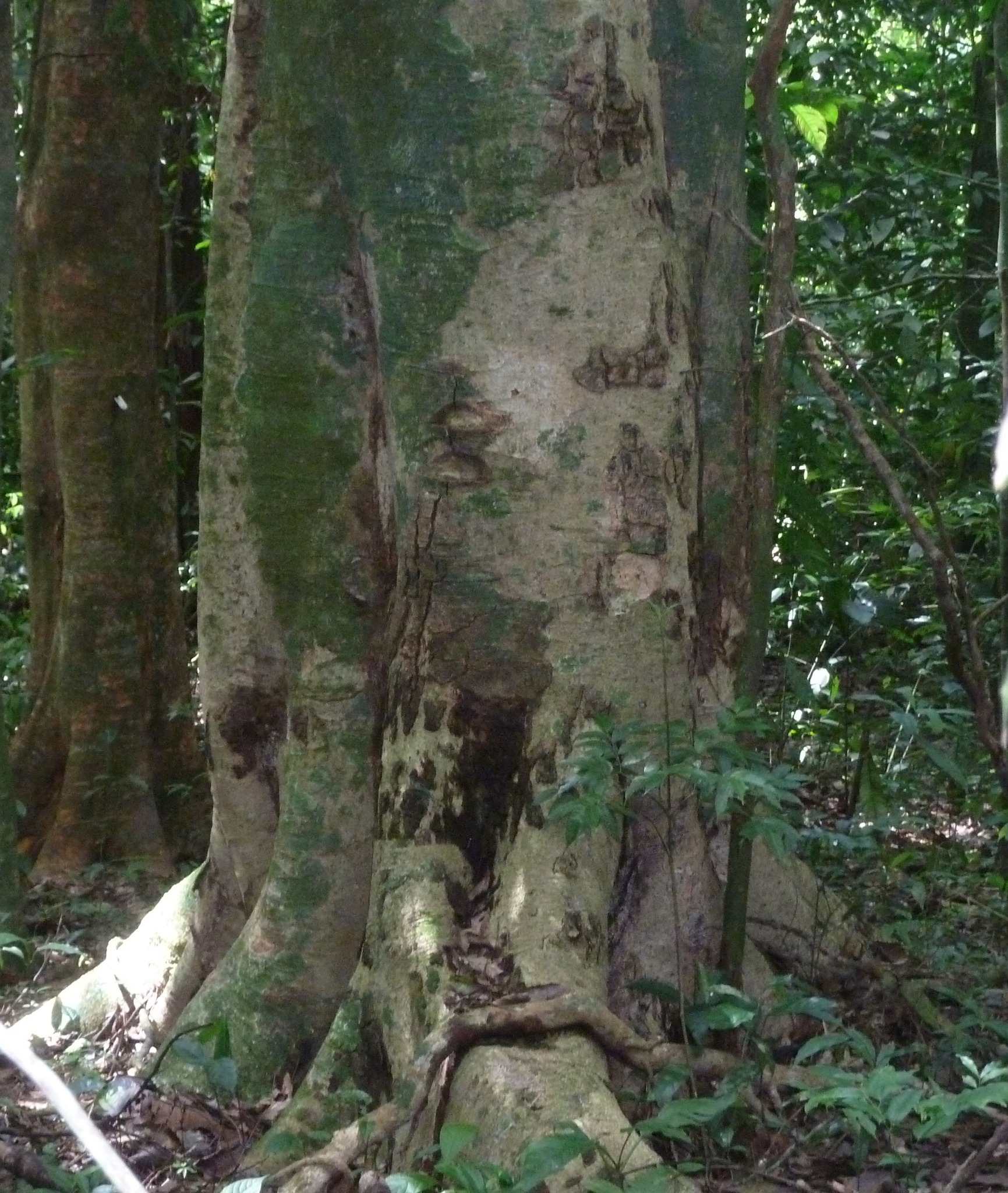

Conservation status
- Least Concern (IUCN 3.1)

Scientific classification
- Kingdom: Plantae
- Clade: Tracheophytes
- Clade: Angiosperms
- Clade: Eudicots
- Clade: Rosids
- Order: Fabales
- Family: Fabaceae
- Subfamily: Caesalpinioideae
- Clade: Mimosoid clade
- Genus: Jupunba
- Species: J. adenophora

Binomial name
- Jupunba adenophora (Ducke) M.V.B.Soares, M.P.Morim & Iganci

Synonyms
- Abarema adenophora (Ducke) Barneby & J.W.Grimes; Pithecellobium adenophorum Ducke

= Jupunba adenophora =

Species of legume

Jupunba adenophora is a species of plant in the family Fabaceae. It is a tree native to Costa Rica, Nicaragua, and northern South America (Colombia, Peru, Venezuela, and northern Brazil).
