= Jupunba zolleriana =

Scientific classification
- Kingdom: Plantae
- Clade: Tracheophytes
- Clade: Angiosperms
- Clade: Eudicots
- Clade: Rosids
- Order: Fabales
- Family: Fabaceae
- Subfamily: Caesalpinioideae
- Clade: Mimosoid clade
- Genus: Jupunba
- Species: J. zolleriana

Binomial name
- Jupunba zolleriana (Standl. & Steyerm.) M.V.B.Soares, M.P.Morim & Iganci

Synonyms
- Abarema zolleriana (Standl. & Steyerm.) Barneby & J.W.Grimes; Pithecellobium zollerianum Standl. & Steyerm.

Species of legume

Jupunba zolleriana is a species of legume of the genus Jupunba in the family Fabaceae. It is a tree native to southern Mexico, Guatemala, and Honduras.
