= Punjuba lehmannii =

Conservation status
- Least Concern (IUCN 3.1)

Scientific classification
- Kingdom: Plantae
- Clade: Tracheophytes
- Clade: Angiosperms
- Clade: Eudicots
- Clade: Rosids
- Order: Fabales
- Family: Fabaceae
- Subfamily: Caesalpinioideae
- Clade: Mimosoid clade
- Genus: Punjuba
- Species: P. lehmannii

Binomial name
- Punjuba lehmannii Britton & Rose

Synonyms
- Abarema lehmannii (Britton & Rose) Barneby & J.W.Grimes; Pithecellobium lehmannii (Britton & Rose) C.Barbosa; Pithecellobium popayanense Barbosa

Species of legume

Punjuba lehmannii is a species of plant in the family Fabaceae. It is native to the Andes of west-central Colombia and southern Peru. In Colombia it is found in the departments of Antioquia, Cauca, Quindío, and Tolima, where it grows in moist montane forest from 1,600 to 2,300 meters elevation.
