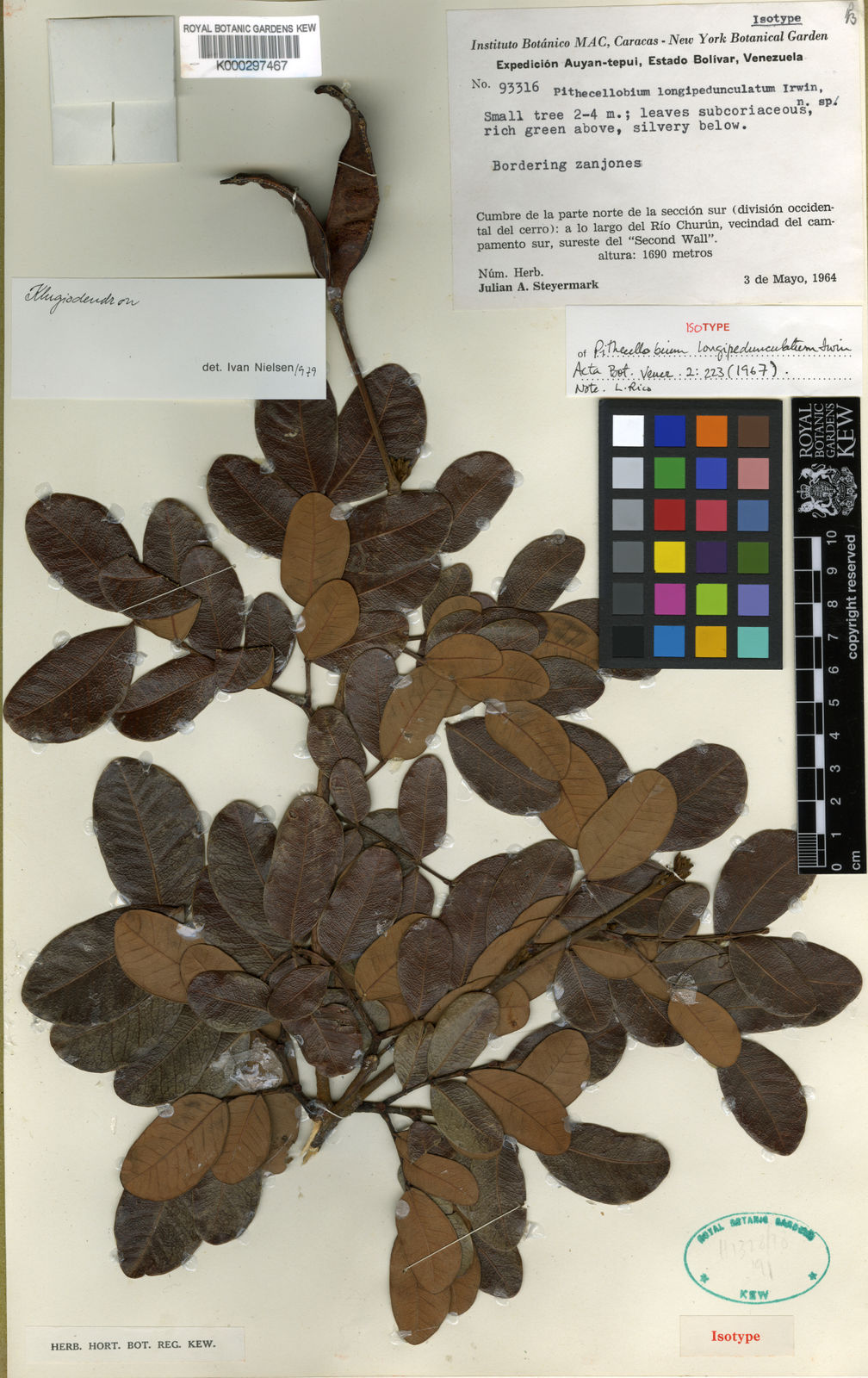

Conservation status
- Least Concern (IUCN 3.1)

Scientific classification
- Kingdom: Plantae
- Clade: Tracheophytes
- Clade: Angiosperms
- Clade: Eudicots
- Clade: Rosids
- Order: Fabales
- Family: Fabaceae
- Subfamily: Caesalpinioideae
- Clade: Mimosoid clade
- Genus: Jupunba
- Species: J. longipedunculata

Binomial name
- Jupunba longipedunculata (H.S.Irwin) M.V.B.Soares, M.P.Morim & Iganci

Synonyms
- Abarema longipedunculata (H.S.Irwin) Barneby & J.W.Grimes; Pithecellobium longipedunculatum H.S.Irwin

= Jupunba longipedunculata =

Species of legume

Abarema longipedunculata is a species of legume in the family Fabaceae. It is a shrub or tree endemic to Bolívar state of Venezuela. It is native to the tepui of Auyantepui at 1,690 meters elevation, and to the tepuis Cerro Guanay, Cerro Jaua, and Cerro Sarisariñama, where it grows on rocky ridges, cliff edges, and in ravines on sandstone substrates.
