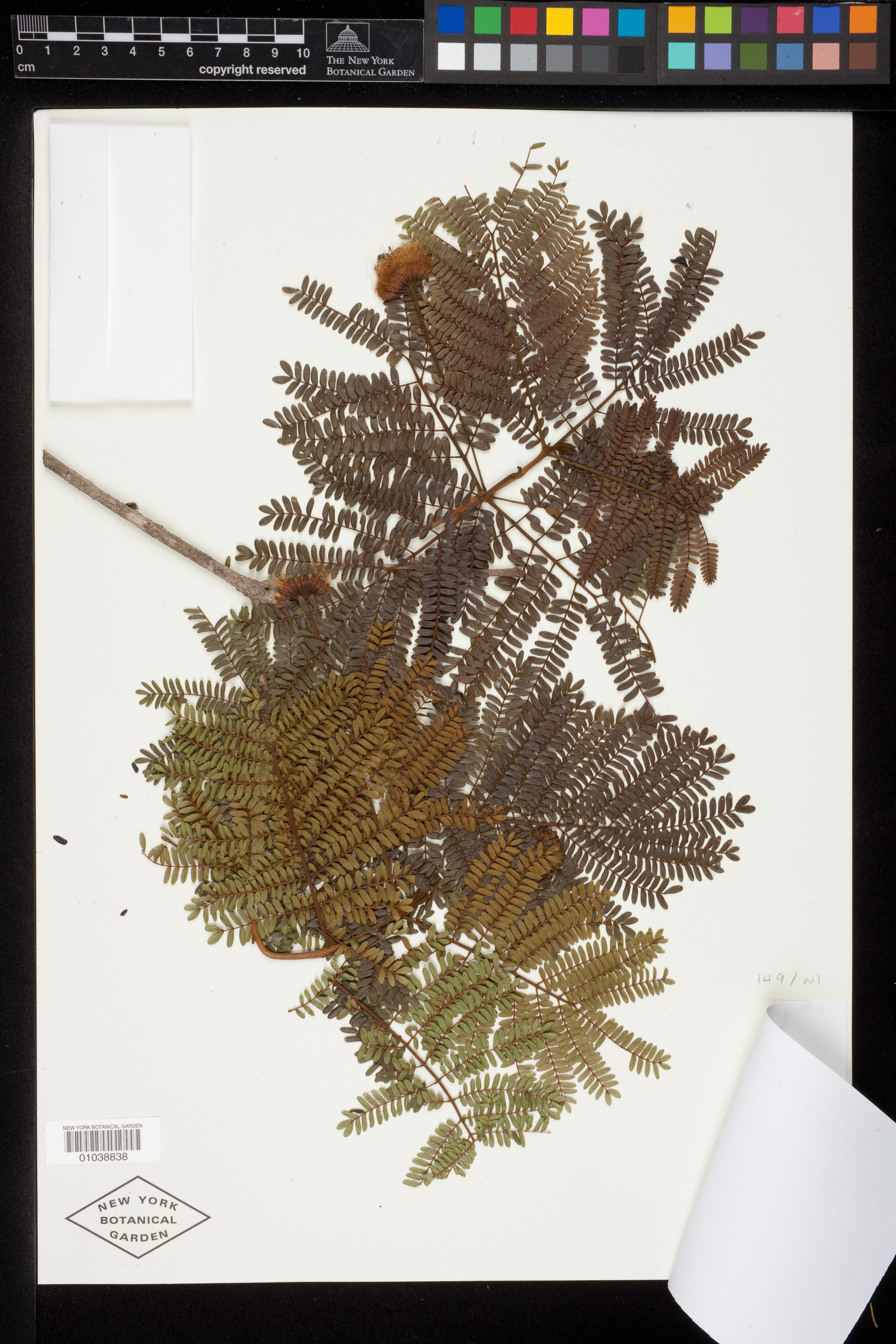

Scientific classification
- Kingdom: Plantae
- Clade: Tracheophytes
- Clade: Angiosperms
- Clade: Eudicots
- Clade: Rosids
- Order: Fabales
- Family: Fabaceae
- Subfamily: Caesalpinioideae
- Clade: Mimosoid clade
- Genus: Jupunba
- Species: J. oppositifolia

Binomial name
- Jupunba oppositifolia (Urb.) Britton & Rose (1928)

Synonyms
- Abarema oppositifolia (Urb.) Barneby & J.W.Grimes (1996); Jupunba trinitensis (Britton) Britton & Rose (1928); Pithecellobium oppositifolium Urb. (1900); Pithecellobium trinitense Britton (1914)

= Jupunba oppositifolia =

Species of legume

Jupunba oppositifolia is a species of flowering plant of the genus Jupunba in the family Fabaceae. It is a tree native to south-central & southeastern Cuba and southwestern and central Hispaniola.
