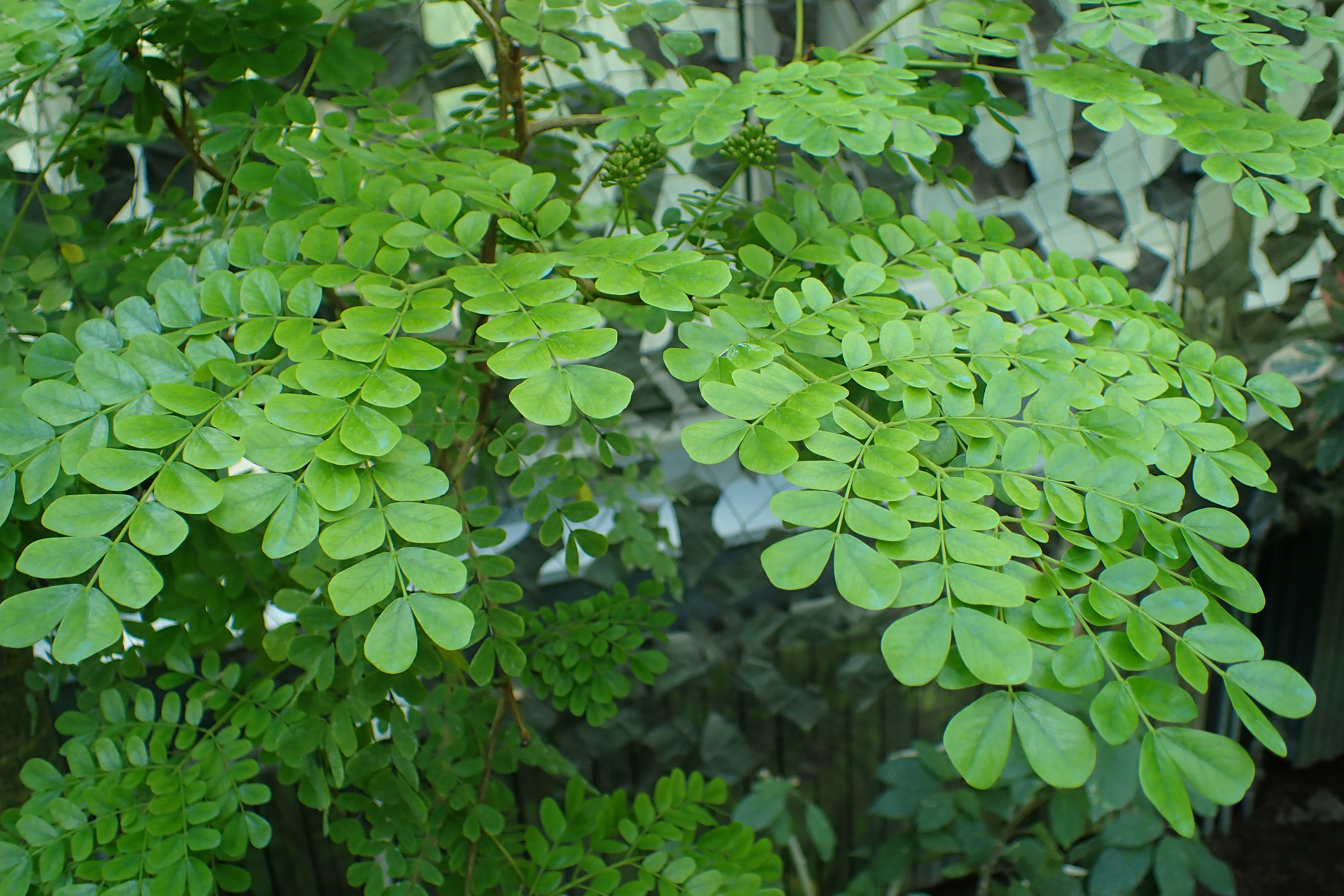

Conservation status
- Near Threatened (IUCN 3.1)

Scientific classification
- Kingdom: Plantae
- Clade: Tracheophytes
- Clade: Angiosperms
- Clade: Eudicots
- Clade: Rosids
- Order: Fabales
- Family: Fabaceae
- Subfamily: Caesalpinioideae
- Clade: Mimosoid clade
- Genus: Jupunba
- Species: J. glauca

Binomial name
- Jupunba glauca (Urb.) Britton & Rose

Synonyms
- Abarema glauca (Urb.) Barneby & J.W.Grimes; Jupunba discolor (Britton) Britton & Rose; Jupunba savannarum (Britton) Britton & Rose; Pithecellobium discolor Britton; Pithecellobium glaucum Urb.; Pithecellobium savannarum Britton

= Jupunba glauca =

Species of legume

Jupunba glauca (synonym Abarema glauca), the glaucous abarema, is a species of tree in the legume family (Fabaceae). It is native to the Bahamas, Cuba, and Hispaniola (the Dominican Republic and Haiti). Jupunba glauca is found most easily on the east coast of Dominican Republic, in Uvero Alto, north of Punta Cana.
