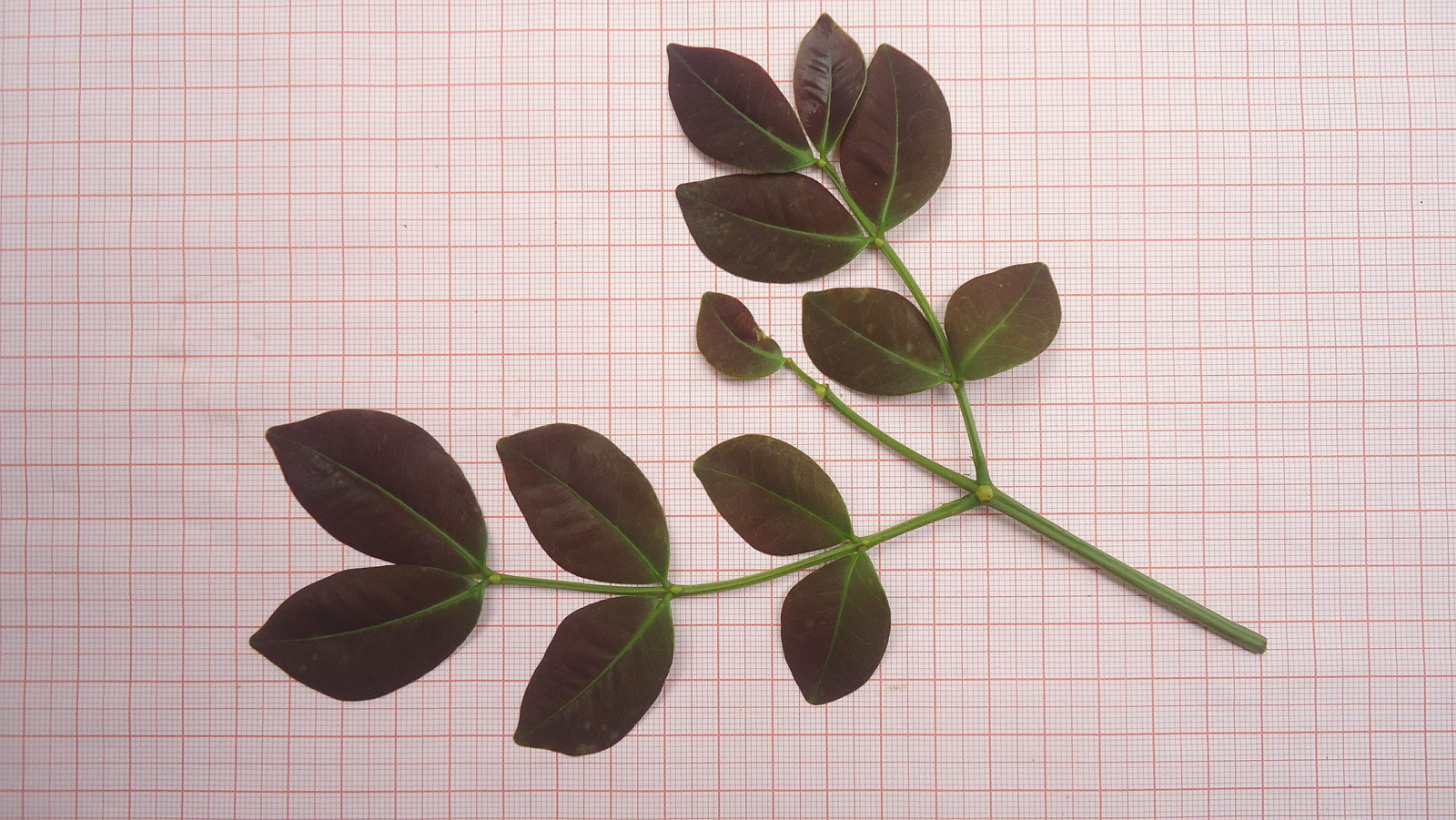

Conservation status
- Vulnerable (IUCN 3.1)

Scientific classification
- Kingdom: Plantae
- Clade: Tracheophytes
- Clade: Angiosperms
- Clade: Eudicots
- Clade: Rosids
- Order: Fabales
- Family: Fabaceae
- Subfamily: Caesalpinioideae
- Clade: Mimosoid clade
- Genus: Jupunba
- Species: J. filamentosa

Binomial name
- Jupunba filamentosa (Benth.) M.V.B.Soares, M.P.Morim & Iganci

Synonyms
- Abarema filamentosa (Benth.) Pittier; Feuilleea filamentosa (Benth.) Kuntze; Inga crassifolia Klotzsch ex Benth.; Inga filamentosa Mart. ex Colla; Pithecellobium filamentosum Benth.

= Jupunba filamentosa =

Species of legume

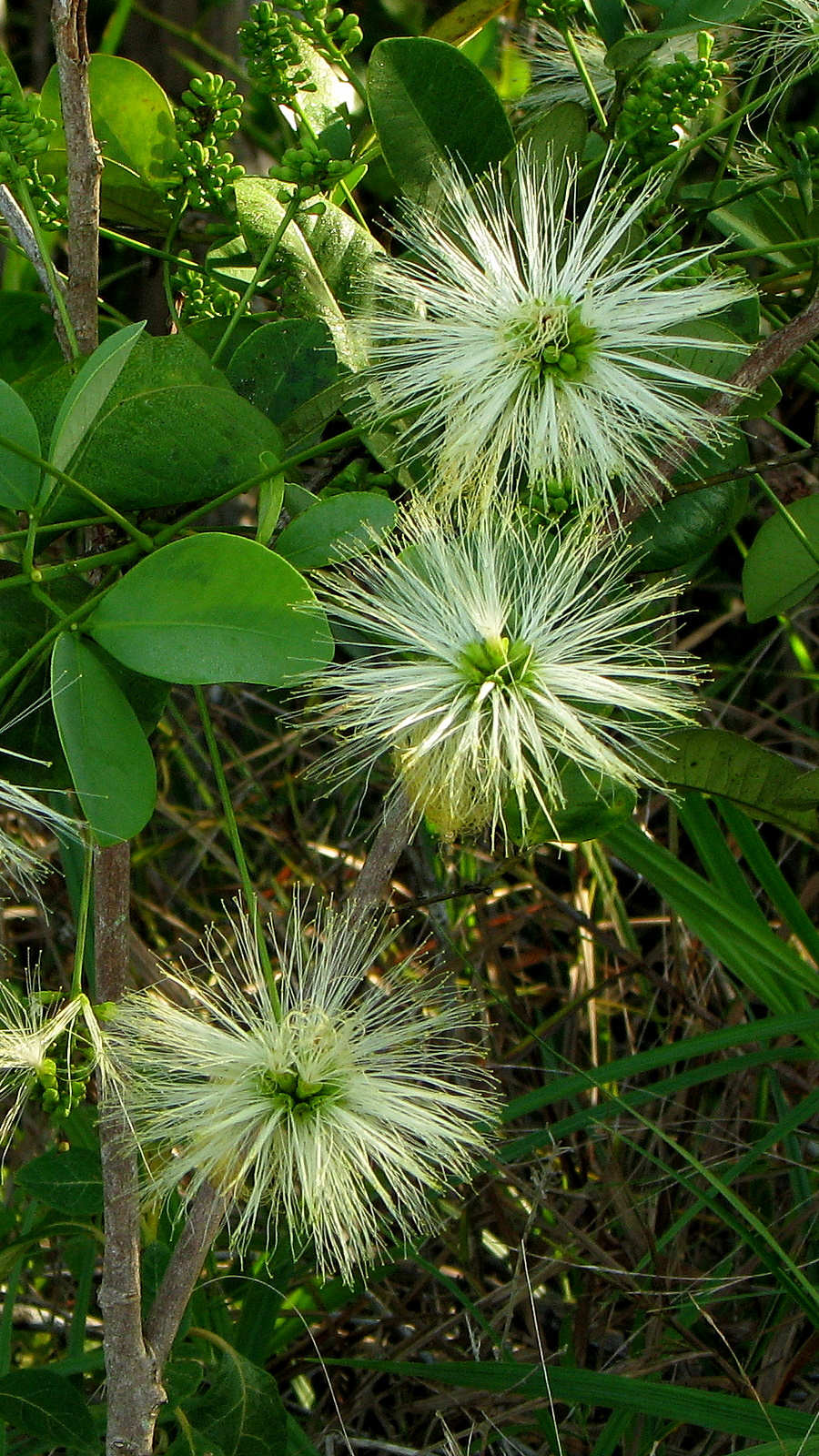
An Abarema filamentosa plant flowering in the wild

Jupunba filamentosa is a species of flowering plant in the family Fabaceae. It is a tree or shrub endemic eastern Brazil, ranging from Rio Grande do Norte to Espírito Santo. It is native to lowland wet Atlantic Forest and restinga.
