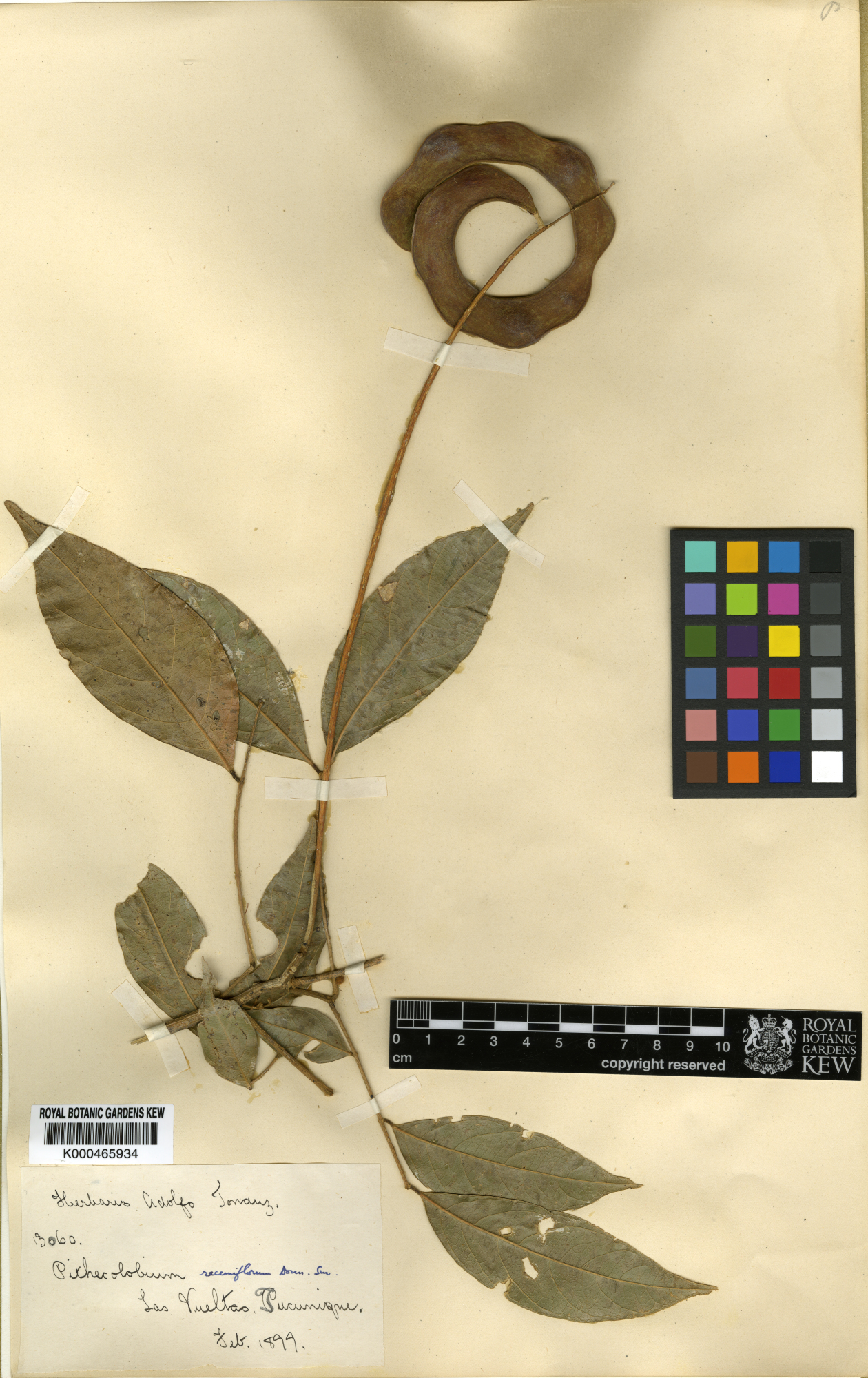

Conservation status
- Least Concern (IUCN 3.1)

Scientific classification
- Kingdom: Plantae
- Clade: Tracheophytes
- Clade: Angiosperms
- Clade: Eudicots
- Clade: Rosids
- Order: Fabales
- Family: Fabaceae
- Subfamily: Caesalpinioideae
- Clade: Mimosoid clade
- Genus: Punjuba
- Species: P. racemiflora

Binomial name
- Punjuba racemiflora (Donn.Sm.) Britton & Rose

Synonyms
- Abarema racemiflora (Donn.Sm.) Barneby & J.W.Grimes; Pithecellobium racemiflorum Donn.Sm.

= Punjuba racemiflora =

Species of legume

Punjuba racemiflora is a species of plant in the family Fabaceae. It is a small to medium-sized tree, growing 4 to 27 meters tall, which is native to Costa Rica and Ecuador. It grows in humid lowland and montane forests from 500 to 2,800 meters elevation.
