= Punjuba killipii =

Conservation status
- Least Concern (IUCN 3.1)

Scientific classification
- Kingdom: Plantae
- Clade: Tracheophytes
- Clade: Angiosperms
- Clade: Eudicots
- Clade: Rosids
- Order: Fabales
- Family: Fabaceae
- Subfamily: Caesalpinioideae
- Clade: Mimosoid clade
- Genus: Punjuba
- Species: P. killipii

Binomial name
- Punjuba killipii Britton & Rose

Synonyms
- Abarema killipii (Britton & Rose) Barneby & J.W.Grimes; Pithecellobium killipii (Britton & Rose) C.Barbosa

Species of legume

Punjuba killipii is a species of flowering plant in the family Fabaceae. It is a tree native to the Andes of western Colombia and Ecuador. It grows in humid montane forests from 900 to 2,600 meters elevation. It is probably pollinated by insects and the seeds dispersed by mammals.
