= Jupunba turbinata =

Conservation status
- Least Concern (IUCN 3.1)

Scientific classification
- Kingdom: Plantae
- Clade: Tracheophytes
- Clade: Angiosperms
- Clade: Eudicots
- Clade: Rosids
- Order: Fabales
- Family: Fabaceae
- Subfamily: Caesalpinioideae
- Clade: Mimosoid clade
- Genus: Jupunba
- Species: J. turbinata

Binomial name
- Jupunba turbinata (Benth.) M.V.B.Soares, M.P.Morim & Iganci

Synonyms
- Abarema turbinata (Benth.) Barneby & J.W.Grimes; Pithecellobium turbinatum Benth.

Species of legume

Jupunba turbinata is a species of flowering plant in the family Fabaceae. It is native to southeastern Bahia state of northeastern Brazil where it grows in the coastal Atlantic Forest and restingas.
