= Jupunba microcalyx =

Conservation status
- Least Concern (IUCN 3.1)

Scientific classification
- Kingdom: Plantae
- Clade: Tracheophytes
- Clade: Angiosperms
- Clade: Eudicots
- Clade: Rosids
- Order: Fabales
- Family: Fabaceae
- Subfamily: Caesalpinioideae
- Clade: Mimosoid clade
- Genus: Jupunba
- Species: J. microcalyx

Binomial name
- Jupunba microcalyx (Spruce ex Benth.) M.V.B.Soares, M.P.Morim & Iganci

Synonyms
- Abarema microcalyx (Spruce ex Benth.) Barneby & J.W.Grimes; Feuilleea microcalyx (Spruce ex Benth.) Kuntze; Pithecellobium microcalyx Spruce ex Benth.

Species of legume

Jupunba microcalyx is a species of plant of the genus Jupunba in the family Fabaceae. It is a tree native to the Amazon rainforest of Colombia, Venezuela, Peru, and northern Brazil. In Colombia it is native to Guaviare and Vaupés departments in the Guiana Shield region, also known as Guayana, in the country's southeast near the borders with Venezuela and Brazil, where it grows up to 200 meters elevation.

Three varieties are accepted.

- Jupunba microcalyx var. enterolobioides (Barneby & J.W.Grimes) M.V.B.Soares, M.P.Morim & Iganci
- Jupunba microcalyx var. microcalyx
- Jupunba microcalyx var. parauaquarae (Ducke) M.V.B.Soares, M.P.Morim & Iganci
