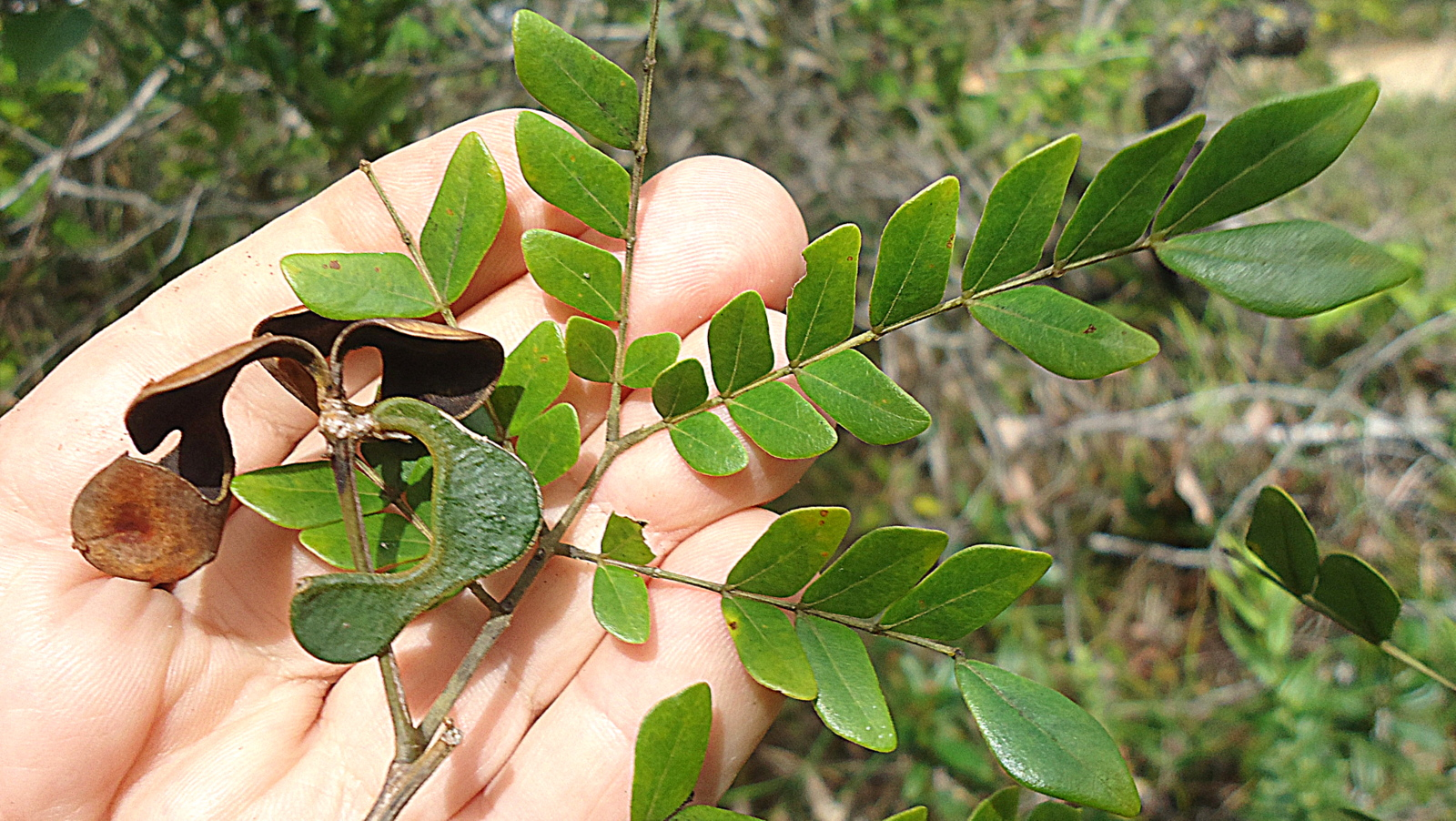

Scientific classification
- Kingdom: Plantae
- Clade: Tracheophytes
- Clade: Angiosperms
- Clade: Eudicots
- Clade: Rosids
- Order: Fabales
- Family: Fabaceae
- Subfamily: Caesalpinioideae
- Clade: Mimosoid clade
- Genus: Jupunba
- Species: J. trapezifolia
- Variety: J. t. var. micradenia

Trinomial name
- Jupunba trapezifolia var. micradenia (Benth.) M.V.B.Soares, M.P.Morim & Iganci (2021)

Synonyms
- Abarema jupunba (Willd.) Britton & Killip (1936); Acacia jupunba Willd. (1806); Feuilleea jupunba (Willd.) Kuntze (1891); Feuilleea micradenia (Benth.) Kuntze (1891); Jupunba jupunba (Willd.) Britton & Rose (1928), not validly publ.; Mimosa jupunba (Willd.) Poir. (1810); Pithecellobium brongniartii Duchass. & Walp. (1853); Pithecellobium jupunba (Willd.) Urb. (1900); Pithecellobium micradenium Benth. (1844)

= Jupunba trapezifolia var. micradenia =

Variety of flowering plant

Jupunba trapezifolia var. micradenia is a variety of the species Jupunba trapezifolia. It is a tree in the family Fabaceae, and is native to tropical South America, Trinidad and Tobago, and the Windward Islands.

It is native to moist tropical forests. The plant is used as a medicine within its native range.
