= Jupunba campestris =

Scientific classification
- Kingdom: Plantae
- Clade: Tracheophytes
- Clade: Angiosperms
- Clade: Eudicots
- Clade: Rosids
- Order: Fabales
- Family: Fabaceae
- Subfamily: Caesalpinioideae
- Clade: Mimosoid clade
- Genus: Jupunba
- Species: J. campestris

Binomial name
- Jupunba campestris (Spruce ex Benth.) M.V.B.Soares, M.P.Morim & Iganci

Synonyms
- Abarema campestris (Spruce ex Benth.) Barneby & J.W.Grimes; Feuilleea campestris (Spruce ex Benth.) Kuntze; Pithecellobium campestre Spruce ex Benth.

Species of legume

Jupunba campestris is a species of plant of the genus Jupunba in the family Fabaceae. It is a shrub or tree endemic to northern Brazil.
