= Jupunba langsdorffii =

Conservation status
- Least Concern (IUCN 3.1)

Scientific classification
- Kingdom: Plantae
- Clade: Tracheophytes
- Clade: Angiosperms
- Clade: Eudicots
- Clade: Rosids
- Order: Fabales
- Family: Fabaceae
- Subfamily: Caesalpinioideae
- Clade: Mimosoid clade
- Genus: Jupunba
- Species: J. langsdorffii

Binomial name
- Jupunba langsdorffii (Benth.) M.V.B.Soares, M.P.Morim & Iganci (2021)

Synonyms
- Abarema langsdorffii (Benth.) Barneby & J.W.Grimes; Feuilleea langsdorffii (Benth.) Kuntze; Pithecellobium langsdorffii Benth.

Species of legume

Jupunba langsdorffii is a species of plant of the genus Jupunba in the family Fabaceae. It is a tree native to eastern Brazil, ranging from southeastern Bahia to Rio Grande do Sul. It grows in the coastal and interior Atlantic Forest.

== Footnotes ==
=== References ===
- Barneby, R.C. & Grimes, J.W. (1996): Silk Tree, Guanacaste, Monkey's Earring: A generic system for the synandrous Mimosaceae of the Americas. Part I. Abarema, Albizia, and Allies. Memoirs of the New York Botanical Garden 74(1): 1–292. ISBN 0-89327-395-3
- International Legume Database & Information Service (ILDIS) (2005): Genus Abarema. Version 10.01, November 2005. Retrieved 2009-12-19.
