= Jupunba cochleata =

Conservation status
- Least Concern (IUCN 3.1)

Scientific classification
- Kingdom: Plantae
- Clade: Tracheophytes
- Clade: Angiosperms
- Clade: Eudicots
- Clade: Rosids
- Order: Fabales
- Family: Fabaceae
- Subfamily: Caesalpinioideae
- Clade: Mimosoid clade
- Genus: Jupunba
- Species: J. cochleata

Binomial name
- Jupunba cochleata (Willd.) M.V.B.Soares, M.P.Morim & Iganci

Varieties
- Jupunba cochleata var. cochleata; Jupunba cochleata var. moniliformis (Barneby & J.W.Grimes) M.V.B.Soares, M.P.Morim & Iganci

Synonyms
- Abarema cochleata (Willd.) Barneby & J.W.Grimes; Feuilleea cochleata (Willd.) Kuntze; Inga cochleata Willd.; Mimosa cochleata (Willd.) Poir.; Pithecellobium cochleatum (Willd.) Mart.

Species of legume

Jupunba cochleata is a species of plant of the genus Jupunba in the family Fabaceae. It is a tree native to the lowland Amazon rainforest of northern, northeastern and west-central Brazil.

Two varieties are accepted:

- Jupunba cochleata var. cochleata
- Jupunba cochleata var. moniliformis (Barneby & J.W.Grimes) M.V.B.Soares, M.P.Morim & Iganci
