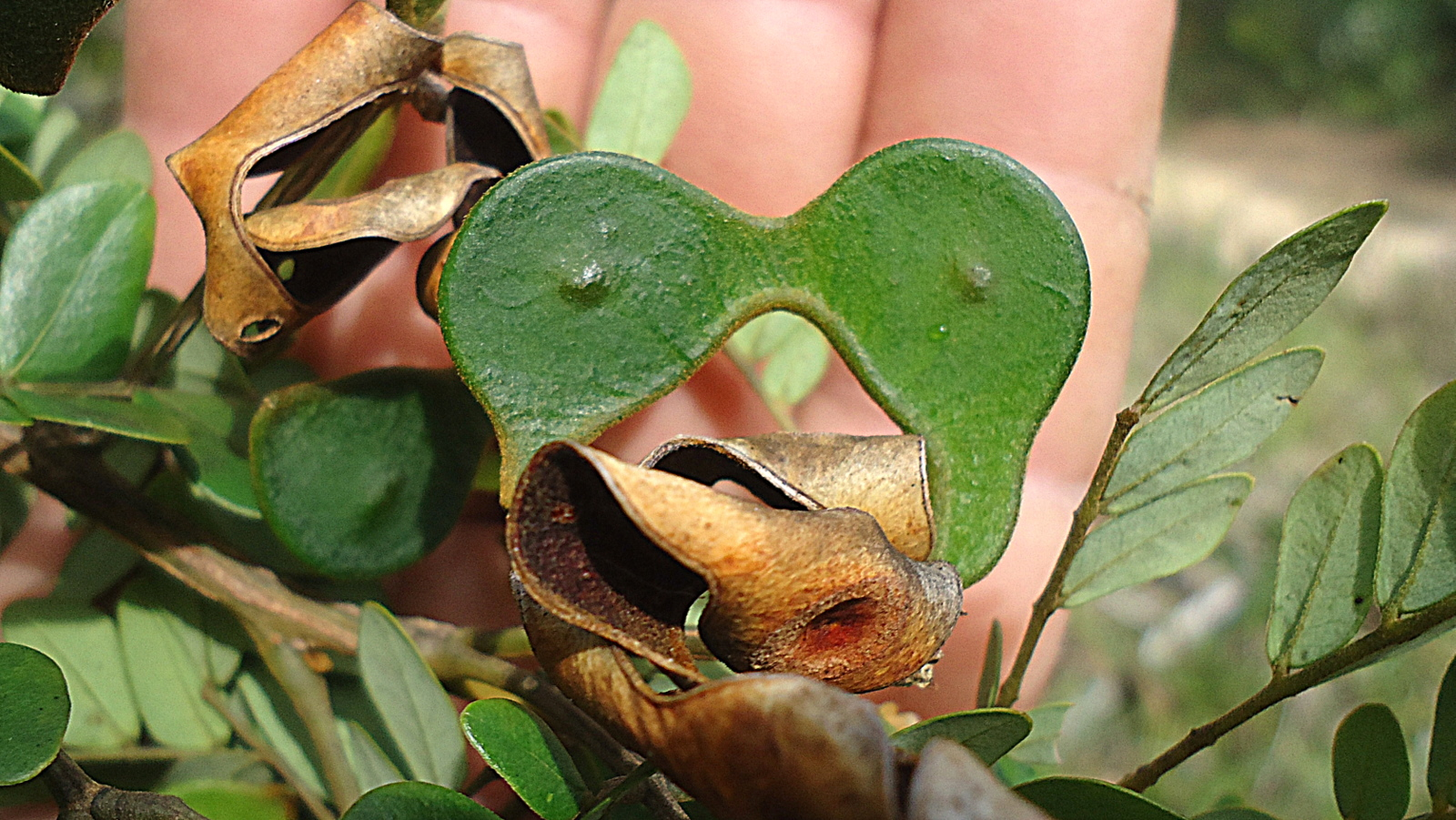
- Jupunba trapezifolia var. micradenia

Conservation status
- Least Concern (IUCN 3.1)

Scientific classification
- Kingdom: Plantae
- Clade: Tracheophytes
- Clade: Angiosperms
- Clade: Eudicots
- Clade: Rosids
- Order: Fabales
- Family: Fabaceae
- Subfamily: Caesalpinioideae
- Clade: Mimosoid clade
- Genus: Jupunba
- Species: J. trapezifolia

Binomial name
- Jupunba trapezifolia (Vahl) Moldenke

Varieties
- Jupunba trapezifolia var. micradenia (Benth.) M.V.B.Soares, M.P.Morim & Iganci; Jupunba trapezifolia var. trapezifolia

Synonyms
- Abarema jupunba var. trapezifolia (Vahl) Barneby & J.W.Grimes; Abarema trapezifolia (Vahl) Pittier; Acacia trapezoides DC. ex Steud.; Inga trapezifolia (Vahl) DC.; Mimosa trapezifolia Vahl; Pithecellobium trapezifolium (Vahl) Benth.

= Jupunba trapezifolia =

Species of flowering plant

Jupunba trapezifolia is a species of flowering plant in the pea family, Fabaceae. It is a tree native to the Lesser Antilles and tropical South America. It grows in moist lowland tropical forest.

== Varieties ==
Two varieties are accepted.

- Jupunba trapezifolia var. micradenia (Benth.) M.V.B.Soares, M.P.Morim & Iganci
- Jupunba trapezifolia var. trapezifolia
