= Jupunba barbouriana =

Scientific classification
- Kingdom: Plantae
- Clade: Tracheophytes
- Clade: Angiosperms
- Clade: Eudicots
- Clade: Rosids
- Order: Fabales
- Family: Fabaceae
- Subfamily: Caesalpinioideae
- Clade: Mimosoid clade
- Genus: Jupunba
- Species: J. barbouriana

Binomial name
- Jupunba barbouriana (Standl.) M.V.B.Soares, M.P.Morim & Iganci

Varieties
- Jupunba barbouriana var. arenaria (Ducke) M.V.B.Soares, M.P.Morim & Iganci; Jupunba barbouriana var. barbouriana

Synonyms
- Abarema barbouriana (Standl.) Barneby & J.W.Grimes; Pithecellobium barbourianum Standl.

Species of legume

Abarema barbouriana is a species of flowering plant of the genus Jupunba in the family Fabaceae. It is a tree native to the tropical Americas, ranging from Costa Rica to Peru, French Guiana, and northern Brazil.

Two varieties are accepted.

- Jupunba barbouriana var. arenaria (Ducke) M.V.B.Soares, M.P.Morim & Iganci – Colombia, Venezuela, Guyana, and northern Brazil
- Jupunba barbouriana var. barbouriana – Costa Rica to Peru, French Guiana, and northern Brazil
