= Jupunba leucophylla =

Conservation status
- Least Concern (IUCN 3.1)

Scientific classification
- Kingdom: Plantae
- Clade: Tracheophytes
- Clade: Angiosperms
- Clade: Eudicots
- Clade: Rosids
- Order: Fabales
- Family: Fabaceae
- Subfamily: Caesalpinioideae
- Clade: Mimosoid clade
- Genus: Jupunba
- Species: J. leucophylla

Binomial name
- Jupunba leucophylla (Spruce ex Benth.) M.V.B.Soares, M.P.Morim & Iganci

Varieties
- Jupunba leucophylla var. leucophylla; Jupunba leucophylla var. vaupesensis (Barneby & J.W.Grimes) M.V.B.Soares, M.P.Morim & Iganci

Synonyms
- Abarema leucophylla (Spruce ex Benth.) Barneby & J.W.Grimes; Feuilleea leucophylla (Spruce ex Benth.) Kuntze; Pithecellobium leucophyllum Spruce ex Benth.

Species of legume

Jupunba leucophylla is a species of plant of the genus Jupunba in the family Fabaceae. It is a shrub or tree native to lowland rainforest in the Amazon Basin of northern Brazil, Colombia, and Venezuela.
