= Jupunba brachystachya =

Conservation status
- Vulnerable (IUCN 2.3)

Scientific classification
- Kingdom: Plantae
- Clade: Tracheophytes
- Clade: Angiosperms
- Clade: Eudicots
- Clade: Rosids
- Order: Fabales
- Family: Fabaceae
- Subfamily: Caesalpinioideae
- Clade: Mimosoid clade
- Genus: Jupunba
- Species: J. brachystachya

Binomial name
- Jupunba brachystachya (DC.) M.V.B.Soares, M.P.Morim & Iganci

Synonyms
- Abarema brachystachya (DC.) Barneby & J.W.Grimes; Abarema obovata (Benth.) Barneby & J.W.Grimes; Calliandra obovata Benth.; Feuilleea lusoria (Vell.) Kuntze; Inga brachystachya DC.; Mimosa lusoria Vell.; Pithecellobium lusorium (Vell.) Benth.

Species of legume

Jupunba brachystachya, the obovate abarema, is a species of plant in the family Fabaceae. It is a shrub or tree endemic to eastern and southern Brazil.
