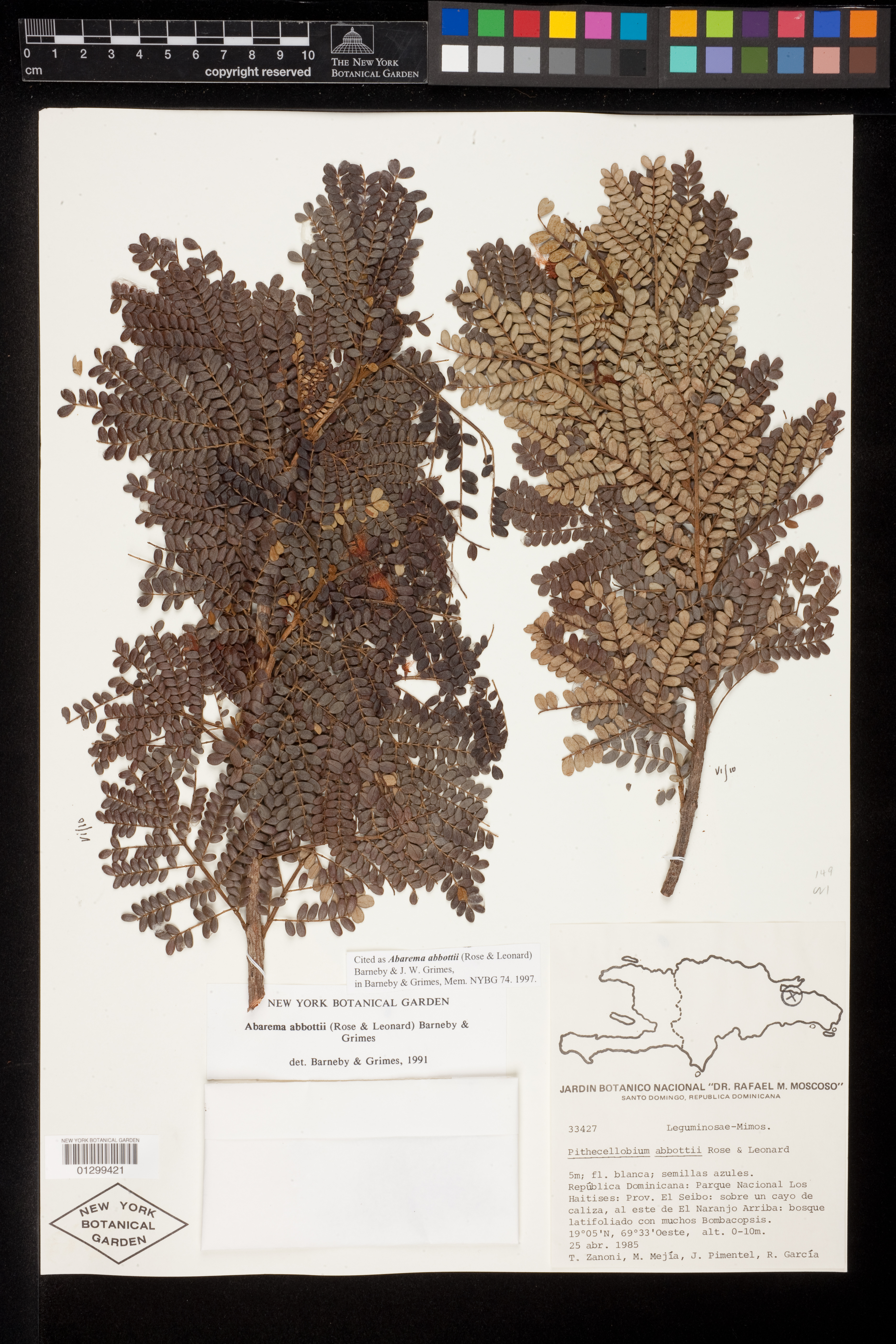

Conservation status
- Vulnerable (IUCN 2.3)

Scientific classification
- Kingdom: Plantae
- Clade: Tracheophytes
- Clade: Angiosperms
- Clade: Eudicots
- Clade: Rosids
- Order: Fabales
- Family: Fabaceae
- Subfamily: Caesalpinioideae
- Clade: Mimosoid clade
- Genus: Jupunba
- Species: J. abbottii

Binomial name
- Jupunba abbottii (Rose & Leonard) Britton & Rose

Synonyms
- Abarema abbottii (Rose & Leonard) Barneby & J.W.Grimes; Pithecellobium abbottii Rose & Leonard

= Jupunba abbottii =

Species of plant

Jupunba abbottii (synonym Abarema abbottii), the Abbott abarema, is a species of plant in the family Fabaceae. It is endemic to the Dominican Republic, and is confined to broad-leaved woodlands on limestone soils.

== Morphology ==
The tree is a perennial plant. It is 4 to 12 metres tall, with rough grey bark.

== Distribution and habitat ==
Distribution: Restricted to north-east Dominican Republic, on the southern shore of Samana Bay and west towards Sa Quita-espuela.

Habitat: A tree confined to broad-leaved woodland on limestone soils up to 800 metres.
