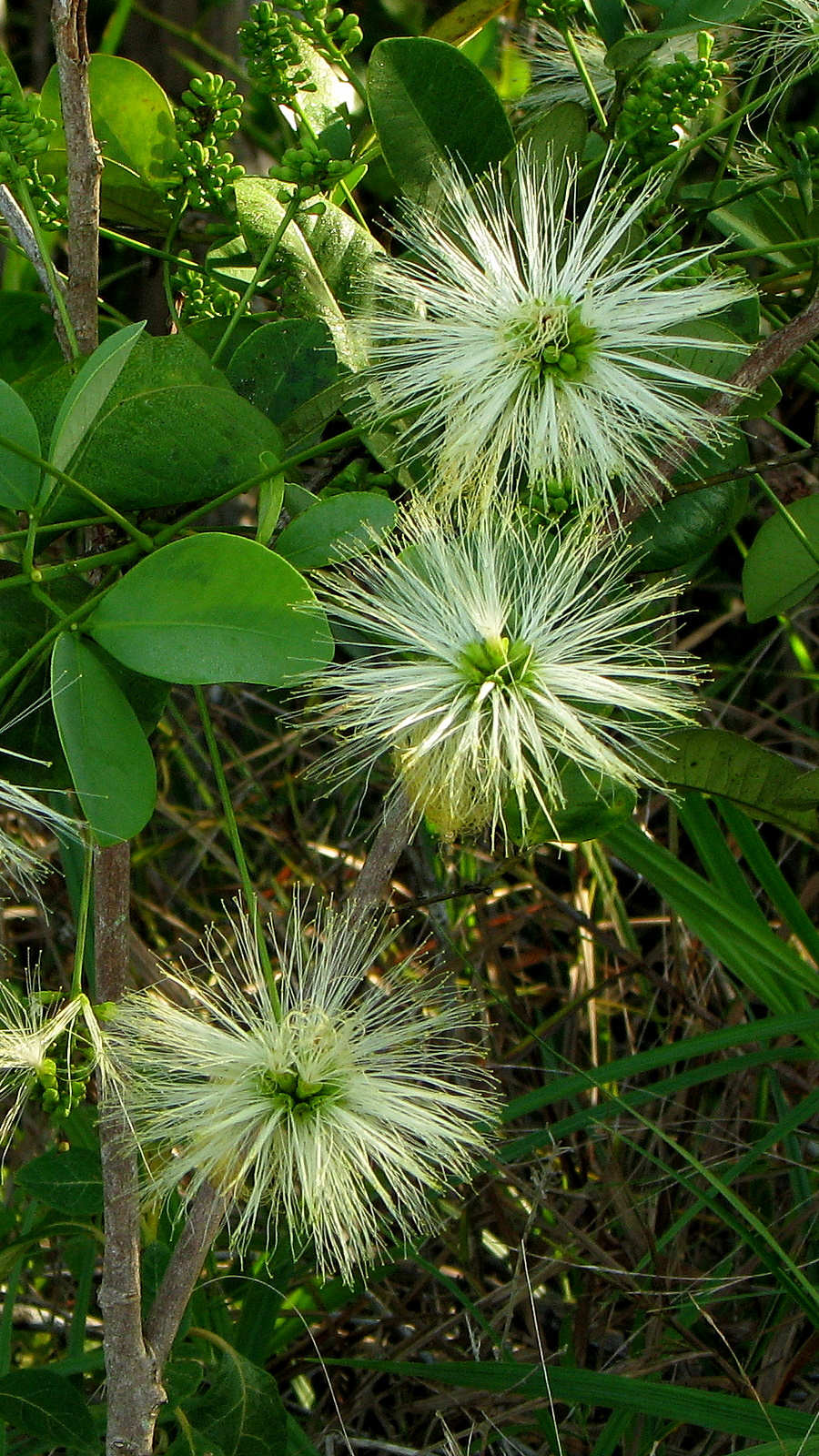
- Flowering Jupunba filamentosa (Benth.) M.V.B.Soares, M.P.Morim & Iganci specimen in situ

Scientific classification
- Kingdom: Plantae
- Clade: Tracheophytes
- Clade: Angiosperms
- Clade: Eudicots
- Clade: Rosids
- Order: Fabales
- Family: Fabaceae
- Subfamily: Caesalpinioideae
- Clade: Mimosoid clade
- Genus: Jupunba; Britton & Rose

Species
- 38; see text

Synonyms
- Klugiodendron Britton & Killip

= Jupunba =

Genus of legumes

Jupunba is a genus in the family Fabaceae. It is native to the tropical Americas, ranging from southern Mexico to the Caribbean, Central America, and tropical South America.

== Species ==
Jupunba has 38 accepted species:

- Jupunba abbottii (Rose & Leonard) Britton & Rose – Dominican Republic
- Jupunba adenophora (Ducke) M.V.B.Soares, M.P.Morim & Iganci – Nicaragua, Costa Rica, Colombia, Venezuela, Peru, and northern Brazil
- Jupunba alexandri (Urb.) Britton & Rose – Jamaica
- Jupunba asplenifolia (Griseb.) Britton & Rose – Cuba
- Jupunba auriculata (Benth.) M.V.B.Soares, M.P.Morim & Iganci – Amazon Basin (Colombia, Peru, and northern Brazil)
- Jupunba barbouriana (Standl.) M.V.B.Soares, M.P.Morim & Iganci – Costa Rica to Peru and northern Brazil
- Jupunba barnebyana (Iganci & M.P.Lima) M.V.B.Soares, M.P.Morim & Iganci – Brazil (Espírito Santo)
- Jupunba brachystachya (DC.) M.V.B.Soares, M.P.Morim & Iganci – eastern and southern Brazil
- Jupunba campestris (Spruce ex Benth.) M.V.B.Soares, M.P.Morim & Iganci – northern Brazil
- Jupunba cochleata (Willd.) M.V.B.Soares, M.P.Morim & Iganci – Brazil
- Jupunba commutata (Barneby & J.W.Grimes) M.V.B.Soares, M.P.Morim & Iganci – Venezuela to Suriname
- Jupunba curvicarpa (H.S.Irwin) M.V.B.Soares, M.P.Morim & Iganci – Guyana, French Guiana, and northern and eastern Brazil
- Jupunba ferruginea (Benth.) M.V.B.Soares, M.P.Morim & Iganci – southeastern Venezuela (Roraima tepui) and northern Brazil (Serra do Sol)
- Jupunba filamentosa (Benth.) M.V.B.Soares, M.P.Morim & Iganci – northeastern Brazil to Espirito Santo
- Jupunba floribunda (Spruce ex Benth.) M.V.B.Soares, M.P.Morim & Iganci – Colombia and Venezuela to Peru and northern Brazil
- Jupunba gallorum (Barneby & J.W.Grimes) M.V.B.Soares, M.P.Morim & Iganci – French Guiana
- Jupunba ganymedea (Barneby & J.W.Grimes) M.V.B.Soares, M.P.Morim & Iganci – Colombia and Ecuador
- Jupunba glauca (Urb.) Britton & Rose – Bahamas, Cuba, and Hispaniola
- Jupunba idiopoda (S.F.Blake) M.V.B.Soares, M.P.Morim & Iganci – southern Mexico to Panama
- Jupunba laeta (Benth.) M.V.B.Soares, M.P.Morim & Iganci – Colombia to Peru, French Guiana, and northern Brazil
- Jupunba langsdorffii (Benth.) M.V.B.Soares, M.P.Morim & Iganci – eastern and southern Brazil (southeastern Bahia to Rio Grande so Sul)
- Jupunba leucophylla (Spruce ex Benth.) M.V.B.Soares, M.P.Morim & Iganci – Amazon Basin (Colombia, Venezuela, and northern Brazil)
- Jupunba longipedunculata (H.S.Irwin) M.V.B.Soares, M.P.Morim & Iganci – Venezuela (Bolívar)
- Jupunba macradenia (Pittier) M.V.B.Soares, M.P.Morim & Iganci – Belize and southeastern Mexico; Nicaragua to Ecuador
- Jupunba maestrensis (Urb.) García-Beltrán – eastern Cuba
- Jupunba mataybifolia (Sandwith) M.V.B.Soares, M.P.Morim & Iganci – Guianas and northern Brazil
- Jupunba microcalyx (Spruce ex Benth.) M.V.B.Soares, M.P.Morim & Iganci – Colombia, Venezuela, Peru, and northern Brazil
- Jupunba nipensis (Britton) Britton & Rose – eastern Cuba
- Jupunba obovalis (A.Rich.) Britton & Rose – Cuba and Hispaniola
- Jupunba oppositifolia (Urb.) Britton & Rose – south-central and southeastern Cuba to southwestern and central Hispaniola
- Jupunba oxyphyllidia (Barneby & J.W.Grimes) M.V.B.Soares, M.P.Morim & Iganci – Honduras
- Jupunba piresii (Barneby & J.W.Grimes) M.V.B.Soares, M.P.Morim & Iganci – northern Brazil to northern Mato Grosso
- Jupunba rhombea (Benth.) M.V.B.Soares, M.P.Morim & Iganci – southeastern Brazil (Espírito Santo to Rio de Janeiro)
- Jupunba trapezifolia (Vahl) Moldenke – Lesser Antilles and tropical South America
- Jupunba turbinata (Benth.) M.V.B.Soares, M.P.Morim & Iganci – northeastern Brazil
- Jupunba villifera (Ducke) M.V.B.Soares, M.P.Morim & Iganci – southern Venezuela, northern Brazil, and Suriname
- Jupunba villosa (Iganci & M.P.Lima) M.V.B.Soares, M.P.Morim & Iganci – southeastern Brazil
- Jupunba zolleriana (Standl. & Steyerm.) M.V.B.Soares, M.P.Morim & Iganci – southern Mexico to Honduras
