= James Walter Grimes =

American botanist

- Born: 1953 (age 72–73)
- Other name: Jim Grimes
- Education: University of Texas
- Known for: Fabaceae research
- Scientific career
- Fields: Botany
- Workplaces: New York Botanical Garden National Herbarium of Victoria
- Thesis: Systematics of New World Psoraleeae (1988)
- Author abbrev. (botany): J.W.Grimes

James Walter Grimes, known as Jim Grimes, is an American botanist.

== Career ==
Grimes can be attributed to over 240 taxa names, either as sole author or co-author. Grimes worked at the New York Botanical Garden studying Fabaceae. In 1996 Grimes moved to Australia, taking up a position in the National Herbarium of Victoria, Royal Botanic Gardens Victoria as Mueller Fellow July–October 1996, where he worked on developmental morphology of inflorescences in Acacia. From July 1997 to his resignation in February 2002, Grimes was in the position of Systematic Botanist. His research interests included the systematics of Fabaceae, subfamily Mimosoideae, and the historic collections held in the Herbarium. Grimes was co-organiser of the 2001 Legumes Down Under conference. He served as Taxonomic Co-ordinator for legume tribes Ingeae and Psoraleeae for the International Legume Database and Information Service (ILDIS) 2000–2, and as Councillor of the Society of Australian Systematic Biologists 2001–2. Grimes was Editor of Muelleria from 1997 to 2001

A significant number, over 1000 collections, are held at NY. MEL holds over 300 specimens collected by Grimes. Other herbaria in Australia holding his collections include MELU, CANB, NSW, HO, ATH, AD, and BRI.

== Standard author abbreviation ==
The standard author abbreviation J.W.Grimes is used to indicate this person as the author when citing a botanical name.

== Selected published names ==
- Abarema abbottii (Rose & Leonard) Barneby & J.W.Grimes
- Zygia turneri (McVaugh) Barneby & J.W.Grimes

- See also Category:Taxa named by James Walter Grimes

and

- International Plant Name Index

== Selected publications ==
=== Journal articles ===
- Barneby, R.C. & Grimes, J.W. (1996). Silk tree, guanacaste, monkey's earring: a generic system for the synandrous Mimosaceae of the Americas. Part I. Abarema, Albizia, and allies. Mem. New York Bot. Gard. 74: 1–292.
- Grimes, J.W. (1996). Nomenclatural changes in Cullen (Fabaceae: Psoraleeae). Muelleria 9: 195–196.
