= Abuta racemosa =

Scientific classification
- Kingdom: Plantae
- Clade: Embryophytes
- Clade: Tracheophytes
- Clade: Spermatophytes
- Clade: Angiosperms
- Clade: Eudicots
- Order: Ranunculales
- Family: Menispermaceae
- Genus: Abuta
- Species: A. racemosa

Binomial name
- Abuta racemosa Triana & Planch.

Synonyms
- Batschia racemosa Thunb.; Trichoa racemosa Pers.

Species of flowering plant

Abuta racemosa is a species of flowering plant in the family Menispermaceae. It is a climbing shrub native to South America.

Abuta racemosa was described in 1862. It is used medicinally.

== Distribution ==
Abuta racemosa is native to the wet tropical biomes of Bolivia, Colombia, and Panama. Within Colombia, it is present in the departments of Antioquia, Bolívar, Córdoba, Santander, Tolima, and Valle del Cauca.

The species grows at elevations of 80–1,000 metres (260–3,280 ft).

== Taxonomy ==
José Jerónimo Triana and Jules Émile Planchon described the species in 1862. Their description was published in the Annales des Sciences Naturelles.

== Description ==
Abuta racemosa is a climbing shrub. The leaves are arranged alternately, and are elliptical to oblong in shape. The flowers of female plants are small.

Abuta racemosa is visibly distinct from other species of Abuta, though it somewhat resembles Abuta obovata.

== Uses ==
Abuta racemosa is used in medicine.

== Conservation ==
The conservation status of Abuta racemosa has not been evaluated.
