= Abuta aristeguietae =

Scientific classification
- Kingdom: Plantae
- Clade: Tracheophytes
- Clade: Angiosperms
- Clade: Eudicots
- Order: Ranunculales
- Family: Menispermaceae
- Genus: Abuta
- Species: A. aristeguietae

Binomial name
- Abuta aristeguietae Krukoff & Barneby

Species of plant

Abuta aristeguietae is a species within the Abuta genus, a constituent of the Menispermaceae family.
