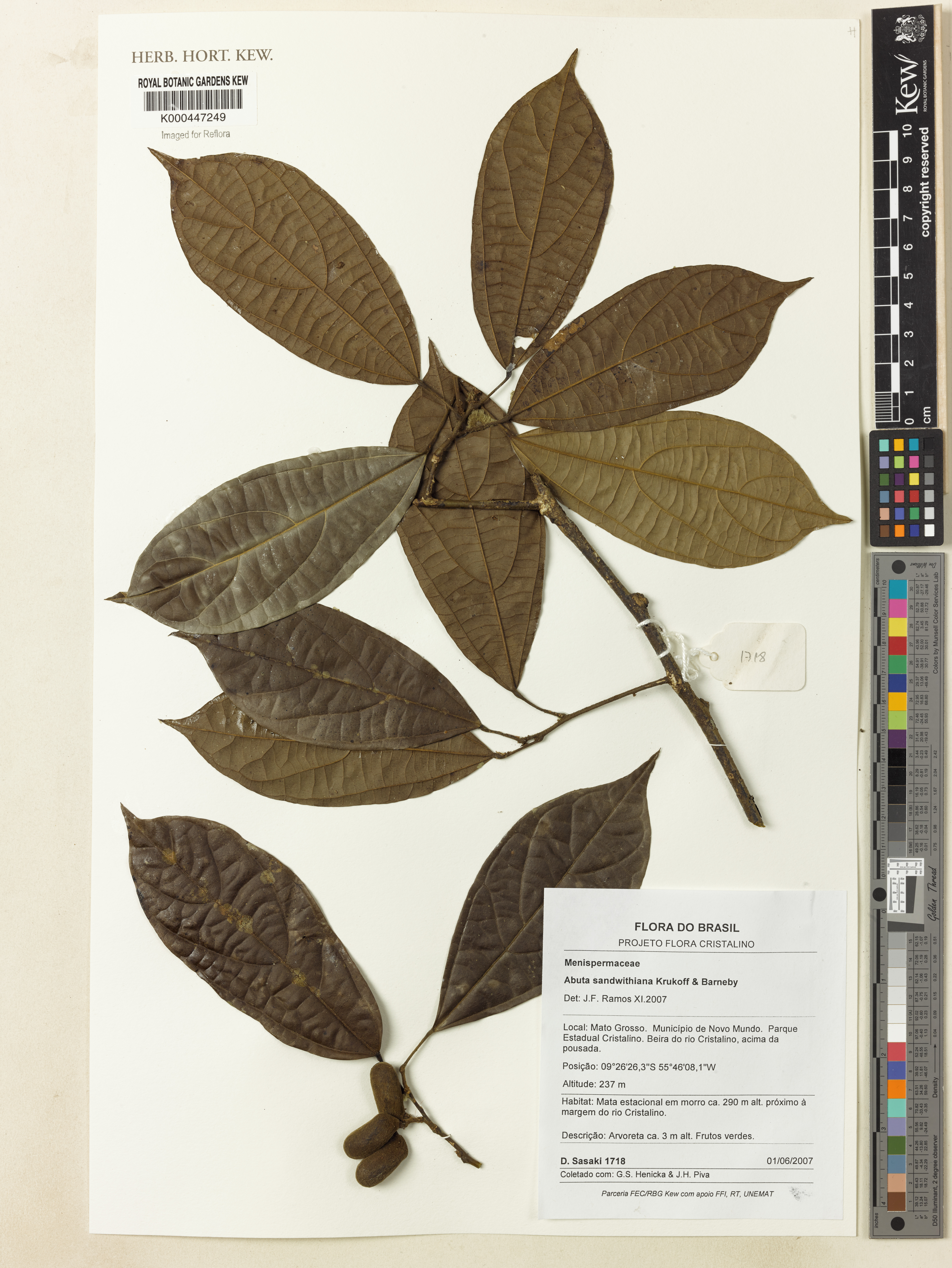

Conservation status
- Least Concern (IUCN 3.1)

Scientific classification
- Kingdom: Plantae
- Clade: Embryophytes
- Clade: Tracheophytes
- Clade: Spermatophytes
- Clade: Angiosperms
- Clade: Eudicots
- Order: Ranunculales
- Family: Menispermaceae
- Genus: Abuta
- Species: A. sandwithiana

Binomial name
- Abuta sandwithiana Krukoff & Barneby

= Abuta sandwithiana =

Species of flowering plant

Abuta sandwithiana is a species of flowering plant in the family Menispermaceae. It is a climbing shrub or tree.

Abuta sandwithiana was described in 1970. The species is native to the wet tropical biome of South America. It has a wide distribution, and is of Least Concern.

== Taxonomy ==
Abuta sandwithiana was named in 1970, by Boris Alexander Krukoff and Rupert Charles Barneby.

== Distribution ==
Abuta sandwithiana is native to South America. The species is present in Bolivia, Brazil, French Guiana, Peru, and Suriname. Within Brazil, the species is present in the states of Acre, Amazonas, Amapá, Pará, Rondônia, Tocantins, and Mato Grosso. Its estimated area of occurrence is 2,318,370.88 square kilometres (895,128.00 sq mi).

Abuta sandwithiana is native to wet tropical biomes. It is present in Campinarana, Igapó (flooded forest), and Várzea forest ecosystems.

== Conservation ==
In 2018, the IUCN assessed Abuta sandwithiana as of Least Concern. It has a wide distribution, a wide population, and faces no significant threats.
