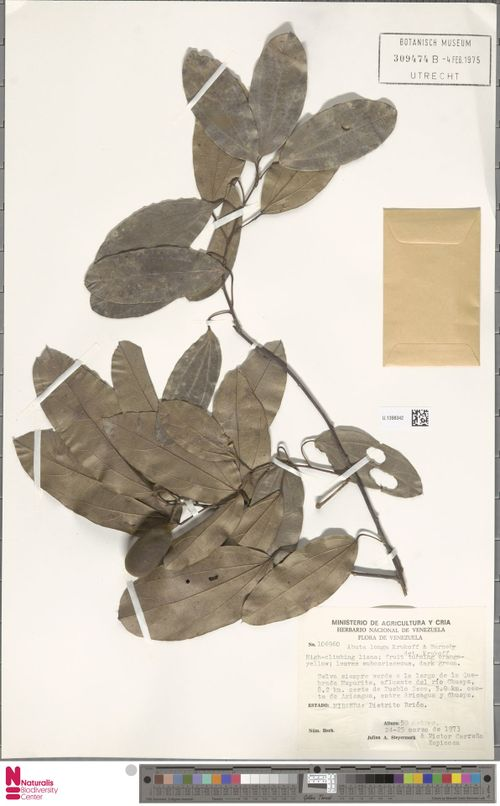

Scientific classification
- Kingdom: Plantae
- Clade: Tracheophytes
- Clade: Angiosperms
- Clade: Eudicots
- Order: Ranunculales
- Family: Menispermaceae
- Genus: Abuta
- Species: A. longa

Binomial name
- Abuta longa Krukoff & Barneby

= Abuta longa =

Species of flowering plant

Abuta longa is a species of climbing plant in the family Menispermaceae. It is native to the wet tropical biome of north-east Venezuela.

Boris Alexander Krukoff & Rupert Charles Barneby described the species in 1970.
