= Abuta pahnii =

Scientific classification
- Kingdom: Plantae
- Clade: Tracheophytes
- Clade: Angiosperms
- Clade: Eudicots
- Order: Ranunculales
- Family: Menispermaceae
- Genus: Abuta
- Species: A. pahnii

Binomial name
- Abuta pahnii (Mart.) Krukoff & Barneby

Species of flowering plants

Abuta pahnii is a species of the Abuta genus, which is part of the flowering plant family Menispermaceae. This genus consists of about 32 species, native to tropical Central and South America.

The plant was first published in Phytologia in 1958.

== Taxonomy ==
The name Abuta ecuadoriensis is a junior synonym. It was first published in H.G.A. Engler (ed.), Das Pflanzenreich, IV, 94: 15 (1910). Carl Friedrich Philipp von Martius originally named the species Cocculus pahni Mart. in 1841. The current name was assigned by Krukoff & Barneby.
