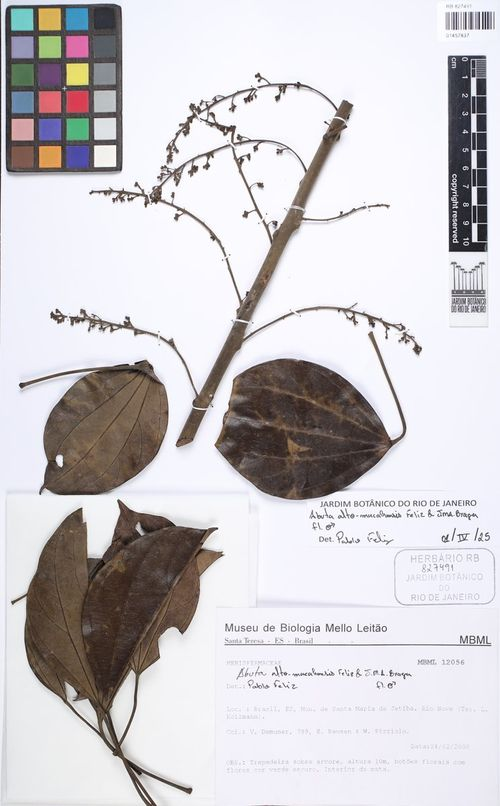

Scientific classification
- Kingdom: Plantae
- Clade: Embryophytes
- Clade: Tracheophytes
- Clade: Spermatophytes
- Clade: Angiosperms
- Clade: Eudicots
- Order: Ranunculales
- Family: Menispermaceae
- Genus: Abuta
- Species: A. alto-macahensis

Binomial name
- Abuta alto-macahensis Feliz & J.M.A.Braga

= Abuta alto-macahensis =

Species of flowering plant

Abuta alto-macahensis is a species of flowering plant in the family Menispermaceae. It is a climbing plant, with thick leaves, brownish flowers, and small orange drupes.

The species is native to south-east Brazil, and was named after the location where it was discovered. The name was originally suggested by Rupert Charles Barneby.

== Distribution ==
Abuta alto-macahensis is native to the wet tropical biome of Rio de Janeiro, in south-east Brazil. It is known from two protected regions of montane rainforest, at elevations of 1,000–1,300 metres (3,300–4,300 ft). Its extent of occurrence is estimated as 3,000–3,500 metres (9,800–11,500 ft).

== Description ==
Abuta alto-macahensis is a climbing liana. It grows up to 25 metres (82 ft) tall. Younger stems are smooth, cylindrical, and ash-coloured or brown. Older branches are porous, and may have short hairs.

The leaves are thick, papery to leathery in texture, 8–24 centimetres (3.1–9.4 in) long, and 5–16 centimetres (2.0–6.3 in) wide. In shape, they are ovate to elliptical. The leaves have smooth edges. The leaf stems are 6–15 centimetres (2.4–5.9 in) long.

The female flowers are brownish, and grow on inflorescences. They have nine sepals, and three brownish carpels. The flower stalks are 2–4 millimetres (0.079–0.157 in) long, and can reach 10 millimetres (0.39 in) when fruiting. The male flowers and inflorescences are not known.

The fruits are small, smooth drupes. The drupes are 5–5.5 centimetres (2.0–2.2 in) long, and 2–5.5 centimetres (0.79–2.17 in) wide. The outer layer is orange and hairless. The seeds are surrounded by a translucent coat. They measure around 3.5 centimetres (1.4 in) long, and 1.5 centimetres (0.59 in) wide. The seeds have a woody endocarp, which is around 4.5 centimetres (1.8 in) long, and 2 centimetres (0.79 in) wide. The endocarp has a horseshoe-shaped groove along its long axis.

The species is similar to Abuta rufescens, though unlike A. rufescens, A. alto-macahensis has short hairs on its leaves, and hairless drupelets.

== Taxonomy ==
The type material was collected in Rio de Janeiro, in March 2004. The species was described in 2022, in the journal Phytotaxa.

== Etymology ==
The species' name, which refers to the location where the species was found, was originally suggested by Rupert Charles Barneby. The authors kept the name "in honour of [Barneby's] work and discovery".
