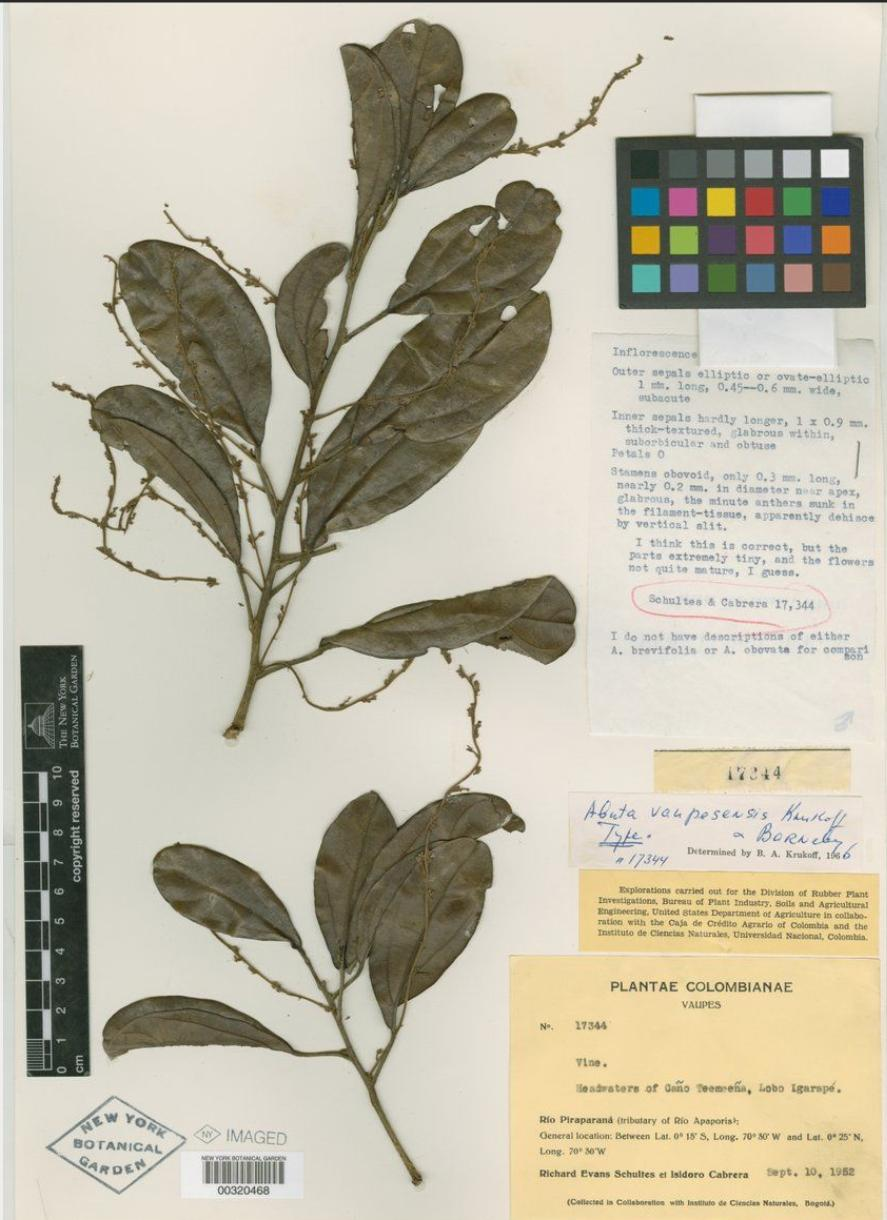

Scientific classification
- Kingdom: Plantae
- Clade: Embryophytes
- Clade: Tracheophytes
- Clade: Spermatophytes
- Clade: Angiosperms
- Clade: Eudicots
- Order: Ranunculales
- Family: Menispermaceae
- Genus: Abuta
- Species: A. vaupesensis

Binomial name
- Abuta vaupesensis Krukoff & Barneby

= Abuta vaupesensis =

Species of flowering plant

Abuta vaupesensis is a species of flowering plant in the family Menispermaceae. It is a climber.

Abuta vaupesensis is native to Colombia and Venezuela. The species was described in 1970. It is used in medicine, and its conservation status has not been evaluated.

== Taxonomy ==
Boris Alexander Krukoff and Rupert Charles Barneby described Abuta vaupesensis in 1970.

== Distribution ==
Abuta vaupesensis is native to Colombia, Venezuela, and probably Brazil. Within Colombia, it is present in the Vaupés Department.

It grows in the wet tropical biome, at elevations of around 150 metres (490 ft).

== Conservation ==
The conservation status of Abuta vaupesensis has not been evaluated.

== Uses ==
Abuta vaupesensis is used in medicine.
