= Abuta fluminum =

Scientific classification
- Kingdom: Plantae
- Clade: Tracheophytes
- Clade: Angiosperms
- Clade: Eudicots
- Order: Ranunculales
- Family: Menispermaceae
- Genus: Abuta
- Species: A. fluminum

Binomial name
- Abuta fluminum Krukoff & Barneby

Species of plant

Abuta fluminum is a species of flowering plant in the family Menispermaceae.

== Description ==
Abuta fluminum, like other species in its genus, is a dioecious climber, although some species in the Abuta genus can also be erect trees or shrubs. The plant has simple leaves.

== Ecology ==
Abuta fluminum is a favorite food source for tamarins, a type of New World monkey.
