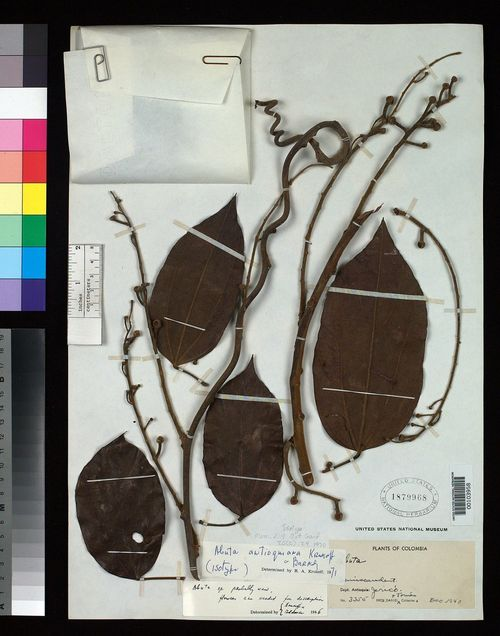

Scientific classification
- Kingdom: Plantae
- Clade: Embryophytes
- Clade: Tracheophytes
- Clade: Spermatophytes
- Clade: Angiosperms
- Clade: Eudicots
- Order: Ranunculales
- Family: Menispermaceae
- Genus: Abuta
- Species: A. antioquiana

Binomial name
- Abuta antioquiana Krukoff & Barneby

= Abuta antioquiana =

Species of flowering plant

Abuta antioquiana is a species of liana in the family Menispermaceae. It is native to Colombia and Bolivia.

The species was described in 1970.

== Distribution ==
Abuta antioquiana is native to the wet tropical biome of Colombia and western Bolivia. Within Colombia, it is found in the departments of Valle del Cauca and Antioquia. The species is present at elevations of 1,320–2,100 metres (4,330–6,890 ft).

== Taxonomy ==
Abuta antioquiana was described by Boris Alexander Krukoff and Rupert Charles Barneby in 1970. The type material was collected from Colombia's Antioquia Department.

== Conservation ==
The conservation status of Abuta antioquiana has not been evaluated.
