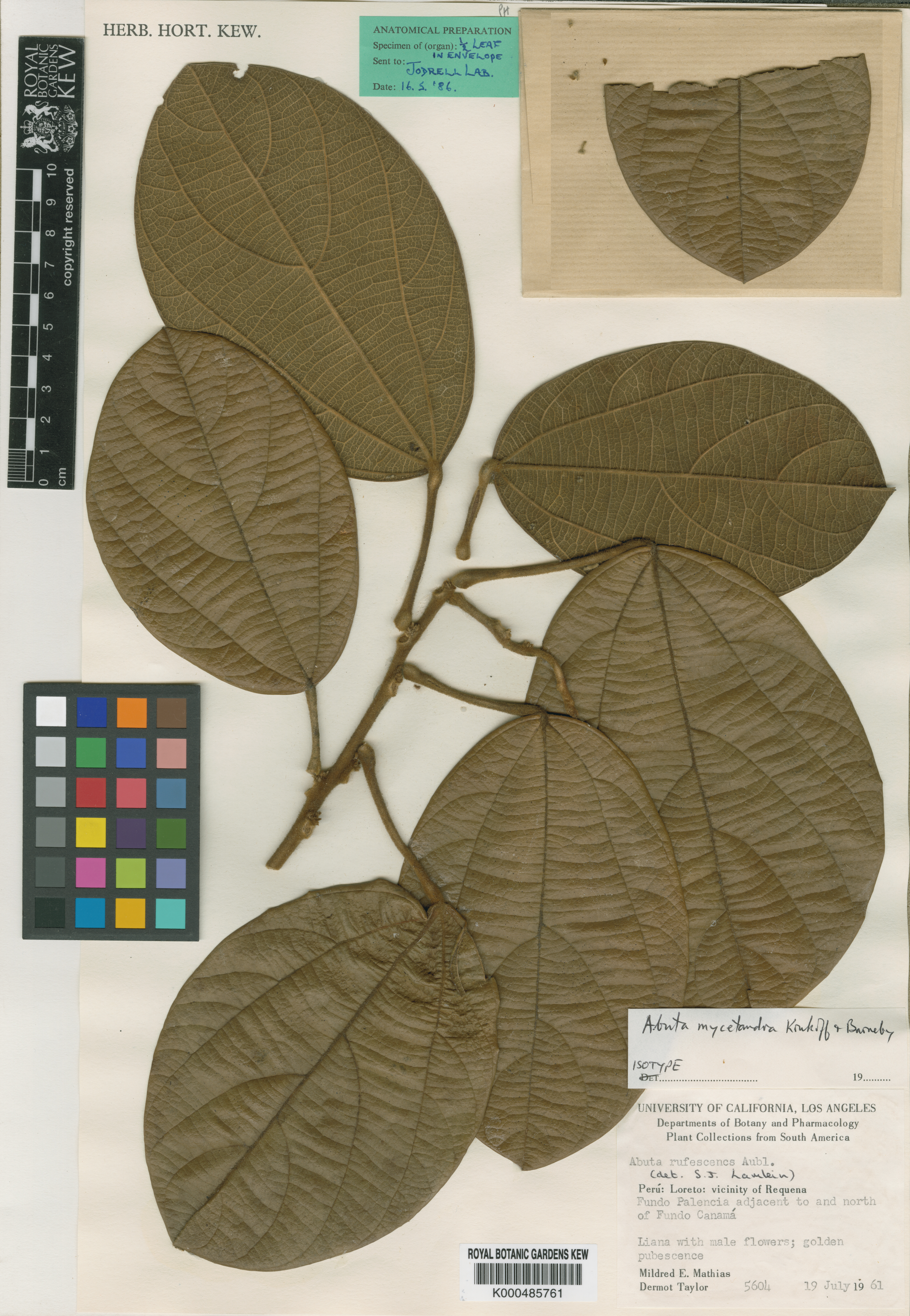

Scientific classification
- Kingdom: Plantae
- Clade: Tracheophytes
- Clade: Angiosperms
- Clade: Eudicots
- Order: Ranunculales
- Family: Menispermaceae
- Genus: Abuta
- Species: A. mycetandra

Binomial name
- Abuta mycetandra Krukoff & Barneby

= Abuta mycetandra =

Species of flowering plant

Abuta mycetandra is a species of flowering plant in the family Menispermaceae. It is a liana.

Abuta mycetandra is native to the wet tropical biome of north-east Bolivia, southern Venezuela, and Peru.

It was described by Boris Alexander Krukoff and Rupert Charles Barneby in 1971. The holotype was collected in Peru.
