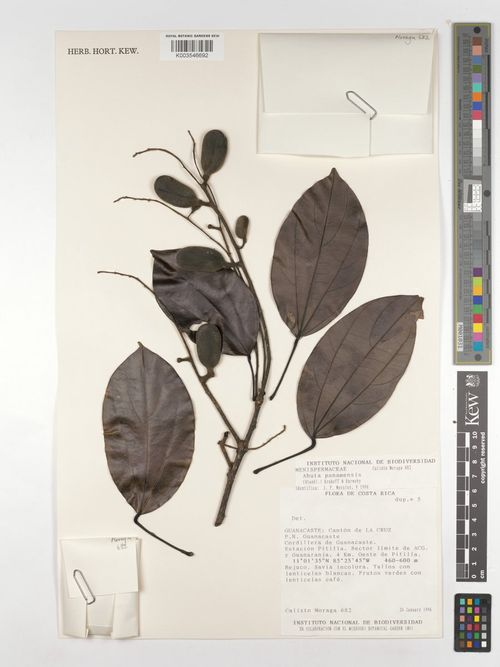

Scientific classification
- Kingdom: Plantae
- Clade: Embryophytes
- Clade: Tracheophytes
- Clade: Spermatophytes
- Clade: Angiosperms
- Clade: Eudicots
- Order: Ranunculales
- Family: Menispermaceae
- Genus: Abuta
- Species: A. panamensis

Binomial name
- Abuta panamensis (Standl.) Krukoff & Barneby

Synonyms
- Hyperbaena panamensis Standl.; Abuta brunnescens (Standl.) Krukoff & Barneby; Hyperbaena brunnescens Standl.; Hyperbaena hondurensis Standl.

= Abuta panamensis =

Species of flowering plant

Abuta panamensis is a species of flowering plant in the family Menispermaceae. It is native to the wet tropical biome of central America and Mexico.

The species was first described in 1925, and received its current name in 1970.

Abuta panamensis is a liana with woody vines and leathery leaves. Its fruits are ovoid drupes.

== Distribution ==
Abuta panamensis is native to the wet tropical biome of central America (Belize, Costa Rica, Guatemala, Honduras, Nicaragua, and Panama) and southern Mexico.

The species is found in wet thickets or forests (sometimes Liquidambar forests), at elevations below 1,600 metres (5,200 ft). It sometimes grows on limestone.

== Taxonomy ==
In 1925, Paul Carpenter Standley described Hyperbaena panamensis, a synonym of Abuta panamensis, from sterile material. Hyperbaena hondurensis was described in 1929, and was later synonymised with Hyperbaena panamensis.

In 1970, the species was moved from the genus Hyperbaena, and described as Abuta brunnescens. Abuta panamensis was given its current name in 1970, by Boris Alexander Krukoff and Rupert Charles Barneby.

== Description ==
Abuta panamensis is a liana with woody vines. The stems can be 15 metres (49 ft) long. The stems have parallel stripes, and older stems have conspicuous pores. The stems are hairless, or have minute golden brown hairs.

The leaves are leathery in texture, elliptical or oblong in shape, and have smooth edges. They are smooth on the upper side, and may have minute hairs on the lower side. The leaves are 6–24 centimetres (2.4–9.4 in) long, and 3–14 centimetres (1.2–5.5 in) wide. They grow on stems, which are 1–9 centimetres (0.39–3.54 in) long.

The male inflorescences are up to 20 centimetres (7.9 in) long, and grow on racemes. The male flowers have six sepals. The female inflorescences are around 8 centimetres (3.1 in) long.

The fruits are ovoid drupes.
