= Abuta chiapasensis =

Scientific classification
- Kingdom: Plantae
- Clade: Embryophytes
- Clade: Tracheophytes
- Clade: Spermatophytes
- Clade: Angiosperms
- Clade: Eudicots
- Order: Ranunculales
- Family: Menispermaceae
- Genus: Abuta
- Species: A. chiapasensis

Binomial name
- Abuta chiapasensis Krukoff & Barneby

Species of flowering plant

Abuta chiapasensis is a species of flowering plant in the family Menispermaceae. It is a liana.

Abuta chiapasensis is native to the wet tropical biome of south‑east Mexico (Chiapas) and Guatemala.

The species was described by Boris Alexander Krukoff and Rupert Charles Barneby in 1970. The type material was collected in Chiapas, Mexico.
