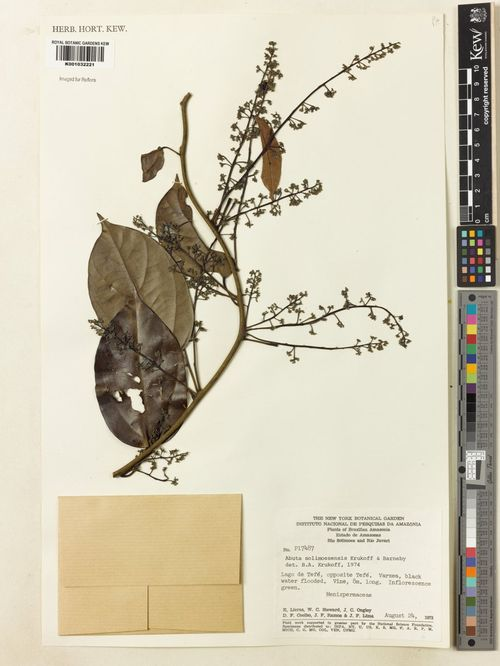

Scientific classification
- Kingdom: Plantae
- Clade: Embryophytes
- Clade: Tracheophytes
- Clade: Spermatophytes
- Clade: Angiosperms
- Clade: Eudicots
- Order: Ranunculales
- Family: Menispermaceae
- Genus: Abuta
- Species: A. solimoesensis

Binomial name
- Abuta solimoesensis Krukoff & Barneby

= Abuta solimoesensis =

Species of flowering plant

Abuta solimoesensis is a species of flowering plant in the family Menispermaceae. The species is native to South America.

Abuta solimoesensis is a climbing plant. The male inflorescences have nine sepals.

The species was described in 1970, and its conservation status has not been evaluated. It is used for food.

== Taxonomy ==
The species was described by Boris Alexander Krukoff and Rupert Charles Barneby in 1970.

== Distribution ==
Abuta solimoesensis is native to the wet tropical biome of South America. It is present in northern Brazil, Colombia, Ecuador, French Guiana, Peru, and Suriname. Within Colombia, the species is present in Amazonas.

The species is present at elevations from 200–300 metres (660–980 ft).

== Description ==
Abuta solimoesensis is a climbing plant. The male inflorescences are slender, and 6–12 centimetres (2.4–4.7 in) long. The secondary inflorescences are up to 1.5 centimetres (0.59 in) long.

The male flowers have nine sepals. The three outermost sepals are 0.3 millimetres (0.012 in) long. The middle sepals are ovate-elliptical, 0.7 millimetres (0.028 in) long, and 0.3 millimetres (0.012 in) wide. The outer sepals are thick, fleshy, 1.7–1.9 centimetres (0.67–0.75 in) long, and 1.6–1.8 centimetres (0.63–0.71 in) wide.

== Conservation ==
The conservation status of Abuta solimoesensis has not been evaluated.

== Nomenclature ==
In Portuguese, the species is known as gogó-de-guariba.

== Uses ==
Abuta solimoesensis is used for food.
