= Abuta chocoensis =

Scientific classification
- Kingdom: Plantae
- Clade: Tracheophytes
- Clade: Angiosperms
- Clade: Eudicots
- Order: Ranunculales
- Family: Menispermaceae
- Genus: Abuta
- Species: A. chocoensis

Binomial name
- Abuta chocoensis Krukoff & Barneby

Species of plant

Abuta chocoensis is a species of flowering plant in the family Menispermaceae found near Chocó in Colombia between Rio San Pablo (Pueblo Nuevo) and Las Animas. It is part of the Abuta genus, which consists of about 32 species native to tropical Central and South America.
