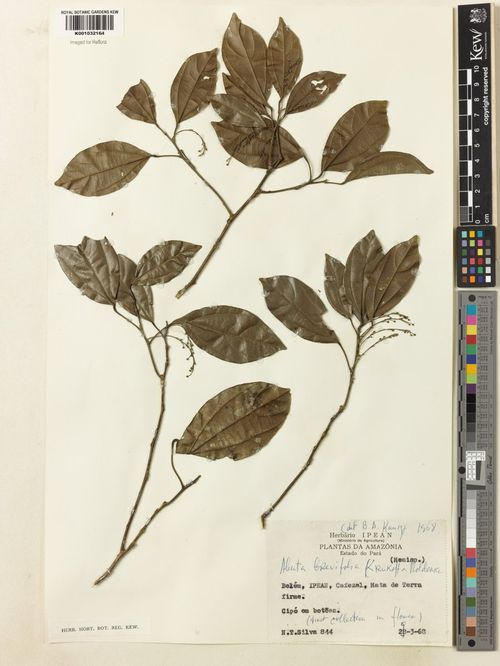

Scientific classification
- Kingdom: Plantae
- Clade: Embryophytes
- Clade: Tracheophytes
- Clade: Spermatophytes
- Clade: Angiosperms
- Clade: Eudicots
- Order: Ranunculales
- Family: Menispermaceae
- Genus: Abuta
- Species: A. brevifolia

Binomial name
- Abuta brevifolia Krukoff & Moldenke

= Abuta brevifolia =

Species of flowering plant

Abuta brevifolia is a species of flowering plant in the family Menispermaceae. It is a liana with leathery leaves and oblong fruits.

The species is native to Brazil, and was first described in 1940.

== Taxonomy ==
Abuta brevifolia was described by Boris Alexander Krukoff and Harold Norman Moldenke, in 1940. The description was published in the bulletin of the Torrey Botanical Club.

== Distribution ==
Abuta brevifolia is native to the wet tropical biome of northern Brazil. It is present in the state of Pará.

== Description ==
Abuta brevifolia is a liana with woody vines.

The leaves are leathery, elliptical, 3.3–7 centimetres (1.3–2.8 in) long, and 2.3–5 centimetres (0.91–1.97 in) wide. The leaf stems are 0.7–1.5 centimetres (0.28–0.59 in) long.

The fruits are oblong, asymmetrical, around 2 centimetres (0.79 in) long, and 1.3 centimetres (0.51 in) wide. The outer layer (exocarp) of the fruit has minute hairs. The central layer (mesocarp) is thick and hard. The innermost layer (endocarp) is thin and shiny.

The female inflorescences are solitary, 3.5–4 centimetres (1.4–1.6 in) long, and have eight to twelve flowers. The flowers grow on 2.5–4.5 millimetres (0.098–0.177 in) long stems.
