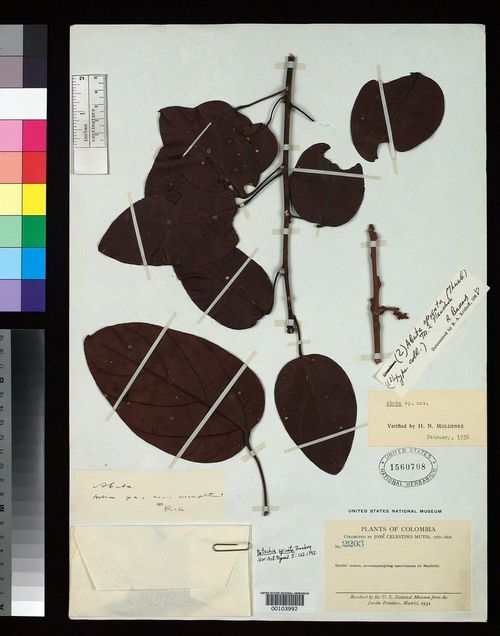

Scientific classification
- Kingdom: Plantae
- Clade: Embryophytes
- Clade: Tracheophytes
- Clade: Spermatophytes
- Clade: Angiosperms
- Clade: Eudicots
- Order: Ranunculales
- Family: Menispermaceae
- Genus: Abuta
- Species: A. spicata

Binomial name
- Abuta spicata Triana & Planch.

Synonyms
- Batschia spicata Thunb.; Trichoa spicata (Thunb.) Pers.; Batschia conferta (Pers.) DC.; Trichoa conferta Pers.

= Abuta spicata =

Species of flowering plant

Abuta spicata is a species of flowering plant in the family Menispermaceae. It is a climbing plant native to Colombia. The species was named in 1862, and its conservation status has not been evaluated.

== Taxonomy ==
Abuta spicata was described by José Jerónimo Triana and Jules Émile Planchon in 1862.

== Distribution ==
Abuta spicata is native to the wet tropical biome of Colombia. Within Colombia, it is present in the departments of Valle del Cauca, Magdalena, Risaralda, and Tolima. The species is also likely to be present in Panama.

Abuta spicata grows at elevations of 770–940 metres (2,530–3,080 ft).

== Conservation ==
The conservation status of Abuta spicata has not been evaluated.
