= Abuta candollei =

Scientific classification
- Kingdom: Plantae
- Clade: Tracheophytes
- Clade: Angiosperms
- Clade: Eudicots
- Order: Ranunculales
- Family: Menispermaceae
- Genus: Abuta
- Species: A. candollei

Binomial name
- Abuta candollei Triana & Planch.

Synonyms
- Abuta manausensis Krukoff & Barneby; Abuta oblonga Miers; Abuta oblonga var. angustifolia Sagot; Abuta rufescens DC.; Abuta rufescens var. oblongata Griseb.

Species of flowering plant

Abuta candollei is a species of flowering plant in the family Menispermaceae. The species can be found in Brazil, Guyana, Suriname, and French Guiana.
