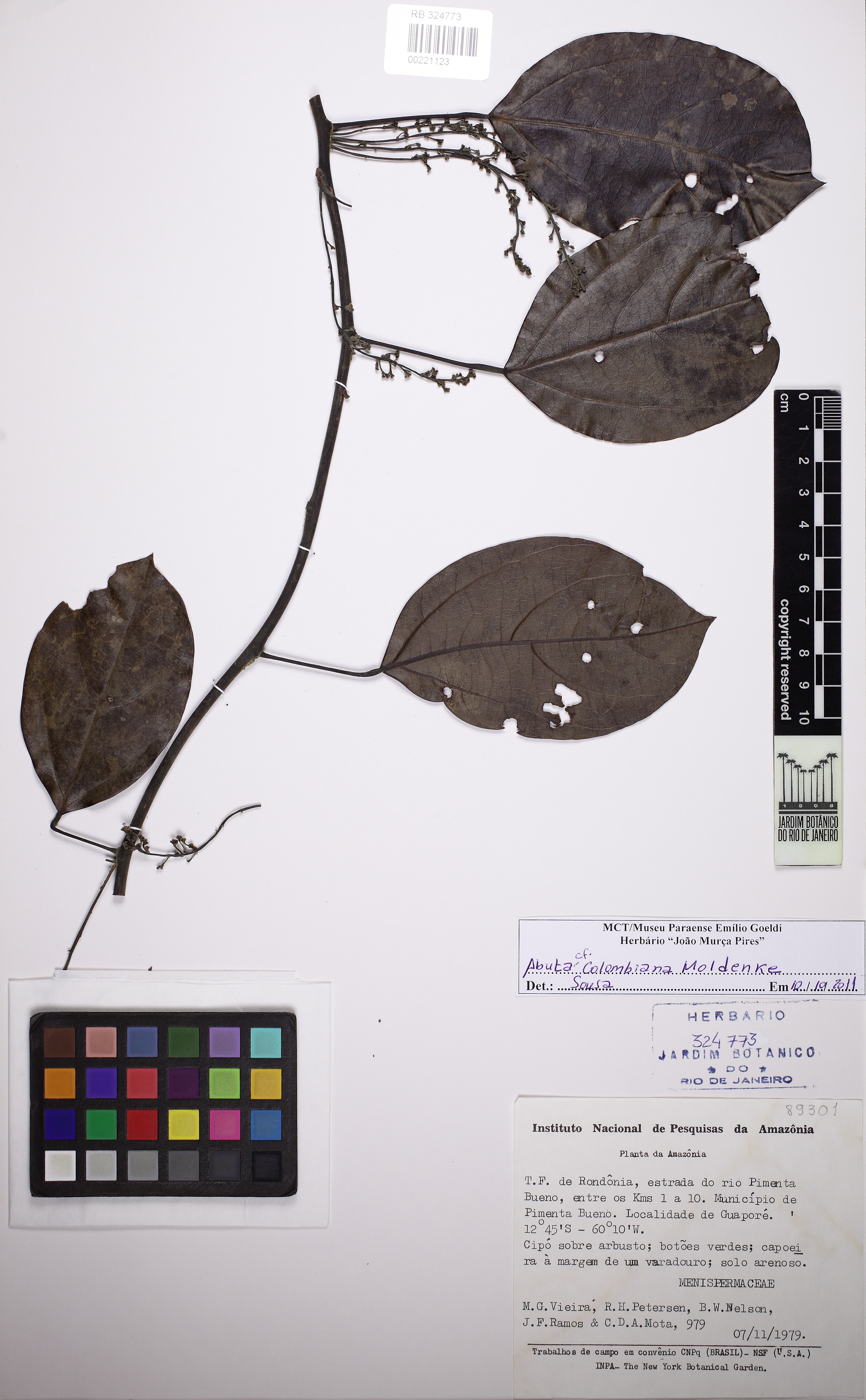

Scientific classification
- Kingdom: Plantae
- Clade: Tracheophytes
- Clade: Angiosperms
- Clade: Eudicots
- Order: Ranunculales
- Family: Menispermaceae
- Genus: Abuta
- Species: A. colombiana

Binomial name
- Abuta colombiana Moldenke. (1938)

= Abuta colombiana =

Species of flowering plant

Abuta colombiana is a species of flowering plant in the Menispermaceae family. It is part of the genus Abuta, which consists of about 32 species native to tropical Central and South America. Abuta colombiana is native to Colombia and northern Brazil, and has been observed in Ecuador and Panama. It was first published in Brittonia in 1938, described from two specimens collected from the Chocó Department in north Colombia. It is closely related to Abuta imene but can be distinguished by the flower stamens.
