= Odontocarya perforata =

Conservation status
- Critically Endangered (IUCN 3.1)

Scientific classification
- Kingdom: Plantae
- Clade: Tracheophytes
- Clade: Angiosperms
- Clade: Eudicots
- Order: Ranunculales
- Family: Menispermaceae
- Genus: Odontocarya
- Species: O. perforata

Binomial name
- Odontocarya perforata Barneby

Species of flowering plant

Odontocarya perforata is a species of plant in the family Menispermaceae. It is endemic to Ecuador.
