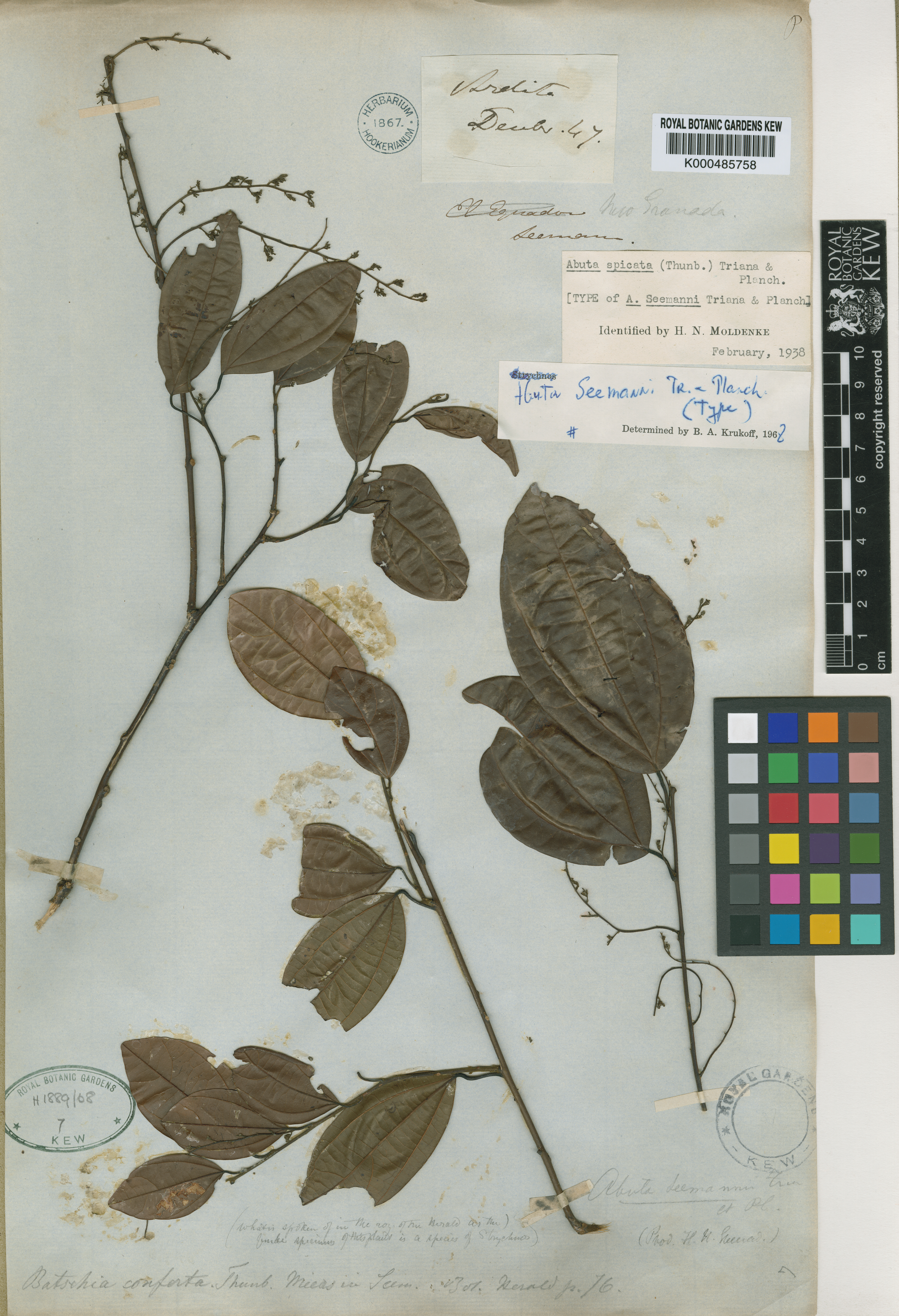

Scientific classification
- Kingdom: Plantae
- Clade: Embryophytes
- Clade: Tracheophytes
- Clade: Spermatophytes
- Clade: Angiosperms
- Clade: Eudicots
- Order: Ranunculales
- Family: Menispermaceae
- Genus: Abuta
- Species: A. seemannii

Binomial name
- Abuta seemannii Triana & Planch.

Synonyms
- Batschia conferta Miers

= Abuta seemannii =

Species of flowering plant

Abuta seemannii is a species of flowering plant in the family Menispermaceae. It is a climbing plant with oblong or obovate drupes. The species is native to Colombia, and was described in 1862.

== Distribution ==
Abuta seemannii is native to the wet tropical biome of Colombia.

== Taxonomy ==
The species was named by José Jerónimo Triana & Jules Émile Planchon in 1862.

== Description ==
Abuta seemannii is a climbing plant.

Its fruits are oblong or obovate drupes, which are 2.5–2.7 centimetres (0.98–1.06 in) long, and 1.5–1.6 centimetres (0.59–0.63 in) in width. The fruits are yellow when fresh, and turn black when dry. The exocarp is leathery, and almost hairless when aged. The mesocarp is thin, fleshy and mucilaginous. The endocarp is around 2 centimetres (0.79 in) long. The seed coat (testa) is hard, and up to 0.8 millimetres (0.031 in) thick.
