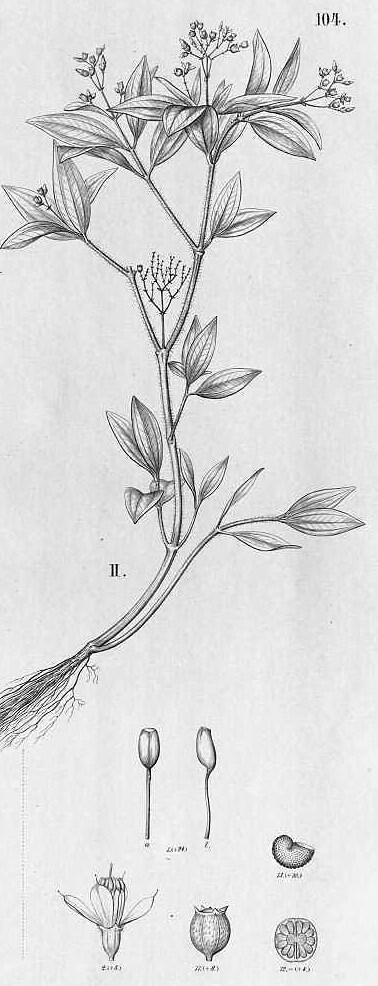
- (image II - Aciotis Martiana)

Scientific classification
- Kingdom: Plantae
- Clade: Tracheophytes
- Clade: Angiosperms
- Clade: Eudicots
- Clade: Rosids
- Order: Myrtales
- Family: Melastomataceae
- Genus: Aciotis
- Species: A. paludosa

Binomial name
- Aciotis paludosa (Mart. ex DC.) Triana

Synonyms
- Spennera paludosa Mart. ex DC.; Aciotis brachybotrya (DC.) Triana; Aciotis brachybotrya var. ferruginea (Naudin) Cogn.; Aciotis ferruginea (Naudin) Triana; Aciotis latifolia (DC.) Cogn.; Aciotis martiana Cogn.; Aciotis paludosa var. latifolia (DC.) Triana; Aciotis spiritusanctensis Brade; Rhexia herbacea Raddi; Spennera brachybotrya DC.; Spennera ferruginea Naudin; Spennera latifolia DC.

= Aciotis paludosa =

Species of plant

Aciotis paludosa is a plant species in the Melastomataceae family, native to Colombia, Venezuela, Brazil, and Peru.

The species was first described as Spennera paludosa in 1828 by Carl von Martius, and was given its current name in 1872 by José Jerónimo Triana who transferred it to his new genus of Aciotis.

It is found in the wet tropical biome.

== Description ==
Carl Friedrich Philipp von Martius describes it as having:

caule basi radicante angulato hirsuto molliter et rufo hirsutissimo, pube hinde bifarium disposita, foliis breve petiolatis ovatis aentis ciliato-serratis 3-5 nerviis sparse pilosis, cyma subpaniculata abbreviata (??) in sabulosis humidis Brasiliae circa Rio Janeiro.

== Etymology ==
The species epithet, paludosa, implies that it is found in boggy places.
