= Leucochloron foederale =

Conservation status
- Vulnerable (IUCN 2.3)

Scientific classification
- Kingdom: Plantae
- Clade: Tracheophytes
- Clade: Angiosperms
- Clade: Eudicots
- Clade: Rosids
- Order: Fabales
- Family: Fabaceae
- Subfamily: Caesalpinioideae
- Clade: Mimosoid clade
- Genus: Leucochloron
- Species: L. foederale

Binomial name
- Leucochloron foederale (Barneby & J.W.Grimes) Barneby & J.W.Grimes

Species of legume

Leucochloron foederale is a species of flowering plant in the family Fabaceae. It is found only in Brazil.
