= Triolena =

Scientific classification
- Kingdom: Plantae
- Clade: Tracheophytes
- Clade: Angiosperms
- Clade: Eudicots
- Clade: Rosids
- Order: Myrtales
- Family: Melastomataceae
- Genus: Triolena; Naudin

Genus of flowering plants

Triolena is a genus of flowering plants in the family Melastomataceae. They are found in southern Mexico southward to Bolivia. As of 1991 there were 20 to 25 species.

Species include:

- Triolena allardii (Wurdack) Wurdack
- Triolena amazonica (Pilg.) Wurdack
- Triolena asplundii Wurdack
- Triolena barbeyana Cogn.
- Triolena calciphila (Standl. & Steyerm.) Standl. & L.O. Williams
- Triolena campii (Wurdack) Wurdack
- Triolena dressleri Wurdack
- Triolena hirsuta (Benth.) Triana
- Triolena hygrophylla (Naudin) L.O. Williams
- Triolena izabalensis Standl. & Steyerm.
- Triolena obliqua (Triana) Wurdack
- Triolena paleolata Donn. Sm.
- Triolena pedemontana Wurdack
- Triolena pileoides (Triana) Wurdack
- Triolena pluvialis (Wurdack) Wurdack
- Triolena pumila Umaña & Almeda
- Triolena pustulata Triana
- Triolena scorpioides Naudin
- Triolena spicata (Triana) L.O. Williams
- Triolena stenophylla (Standl. & Steyerm.) Standl. & L.O. Williams
