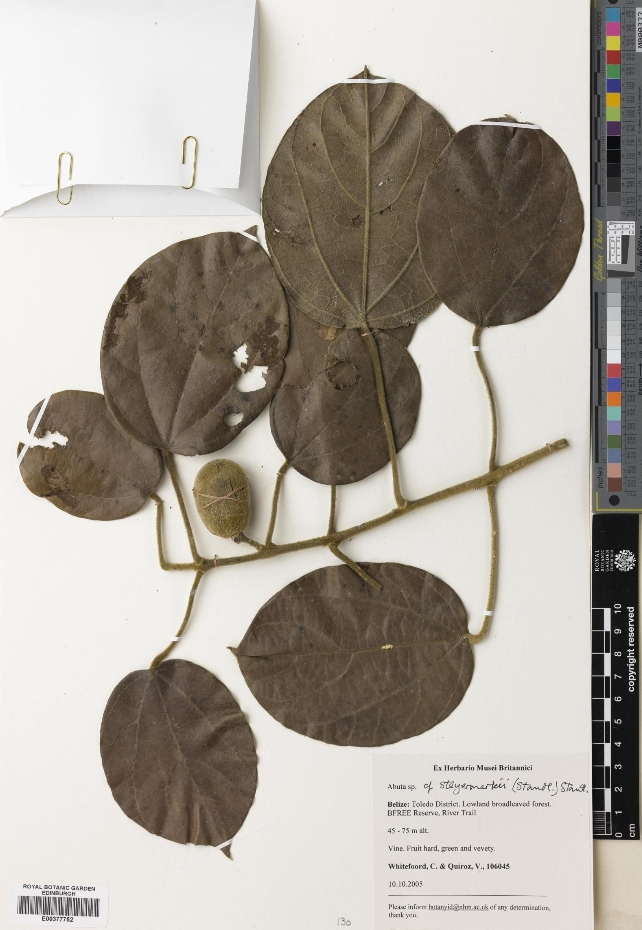

Scientific classification
- Kingdom: Plantae
- Clade: Embryophytes
- Clade: Tracheophytes
- Clade: Spermatophytes
- Clade: Angiosperms
- Clade: Eudicots
- Order: Ranunculales
- Family: Menispermaceae
- Genus: Abuta
- Species: A. steyermarkii

Binomial name
- Abuta steyermarkii (Standl.) Standl.

Synonyms
- Hyperbaena steyermarkii Standl.

= Abuta steyermarkii =

Species of flowering plant

Abuta steyermarkii is a species of flowering plant in the family Menispermaceae. The species is native to Mexico and Central America. It was first described in 1940.

Abuta steyermarkii is a woody liana with leathery leaves and whitish flowers. It is similar in appearance to Abuta rufescens.

== Distribution ==
Abuta steyermarkii is native to the wet tropical biome of Mexico (Oaxaca and Chiapas) and Central America (Belize, Costa Rica, Guatemala, Honduras, and Nicaragua). It grows in moist forests, at elevations below 900 metres (3,000 ft).

Abuta steyermarkii was the first species of the genus Abuta to be recorded outside of South America.

== Taxonomy ==
The species was described by Paul Carpenter Standley in 1940, as Hyperbaena steyermarkii. In 1944, Standley moved the species to the genus Abuta.

== Description ==
Abuta steyermarkii is a large woody liana. The stems are cylindrical, and have short, matted hairs.

The leaves are firm and leathery. The leaves may be almost circular, broadly elliptical, or oblong. The leaves are 9–16 centimetres (3.5–6.3 in) long, and 4–14 centimetres (1.6–5.5 in) wide. They grow on 2–9 centimetres (0.79–3.54 in) long stems.

The female flowers are whitish, and form a dense spike up to 5 centimetres (2.0 in) long. They are sessile (attached without stems).

The plant has one or two dark brown fruits, which are 3.5 centimetres (1.4 in) long, and 2.5 centimetres (0.98 in) wide.

Abuta steyermarkii is similar to Abuta rufescens. The species have similar foliage, but can be distinguished by their flowers. The flowers of A. steyermarkii have no stems, and the female flowers of A. rufescens have long stems.

== Ecology ==
Abuta steyermarkii is a host of the butterfly Anastrus obscurus.
