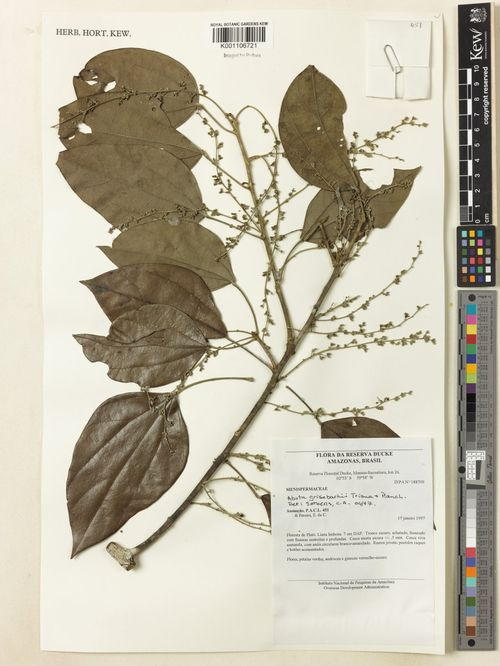

Conservation status
- Least Concern (IUCN 3.1)

Scientific classification
- Kingdom: Plantae
- Clade: Tracheophytes
- Clade: Angiosperms
- Clade: Eudicots
- Order: Ranunculales
- Family: Menispermaceae
- Genus: Abuta
- Species: A. grisebachii

Binomial name
- Abuta grisebachii Triana & Planch.

Synonyms
- Abuta cuspidata Miers; Abuta cuspidata var. ovalifolia Miers; Abuta rufescens Griseb.

= Abuta grisebachii =

Species of flowering plant

Abuta grisebachii is a species of climbing plant in the family Menispermaceae. It is a large climbing vine, found across South America.

A. grisebachii has a widespread distribution, and is of Least Concern. The species was described in 1862, by José Jerónimo Triana and Jules Émile Planchon.

== Distribution ==
Abuta grisebachii is native to the wet tropical biome of South America. It is present in Brazil, Colombia, Peru, and Venezuela, and may be present in French Guiana.

== Description ==
Abuta grisebachii is a large climbing vine, which often reaches the tops of trees.

The male flowers have three outer sepals, and three inner sepals. The outer sepals are 1–1.2 millimetres (0.039–0.047 in) long, 0.7 millimetres (0.028 in) wide, and elliptical. The inner sepals are 1–1.5 millimetres (0.039–0.059 in) long, around 1 millimetre (0.039 in) wide, and elliptical. The male flowers have six stamens. It also has six sterile staminodes, which are hairless, and around 0.6 millimetres (0.024 in) long.

The female flowers have three outer sepals, and three inner sepals. The outer sepals are ovate, around 0.8 millimetres (0.031 in) long, and 0.8 millimetres (0.031 in) wide. The inner sepals are around 1.5 millimetres (0.059 in) long, and 1.5 millimetres (0.059 in) wide. The flowers have three ovaries, which are around 0.6 millimetres (0.024 in). The ovaries have dense brownish hairs, which point upwards.

== Conservation ==
In 2018, the IUCN classified Abuta grisebachii as of Least Concern. It has a large population, and faces no major threats. The species occurs across an area of 3,290,508 square kilometres (1,270,472 sq mi).

== Uses ==
Abuta grisebachii is used in medicine.
