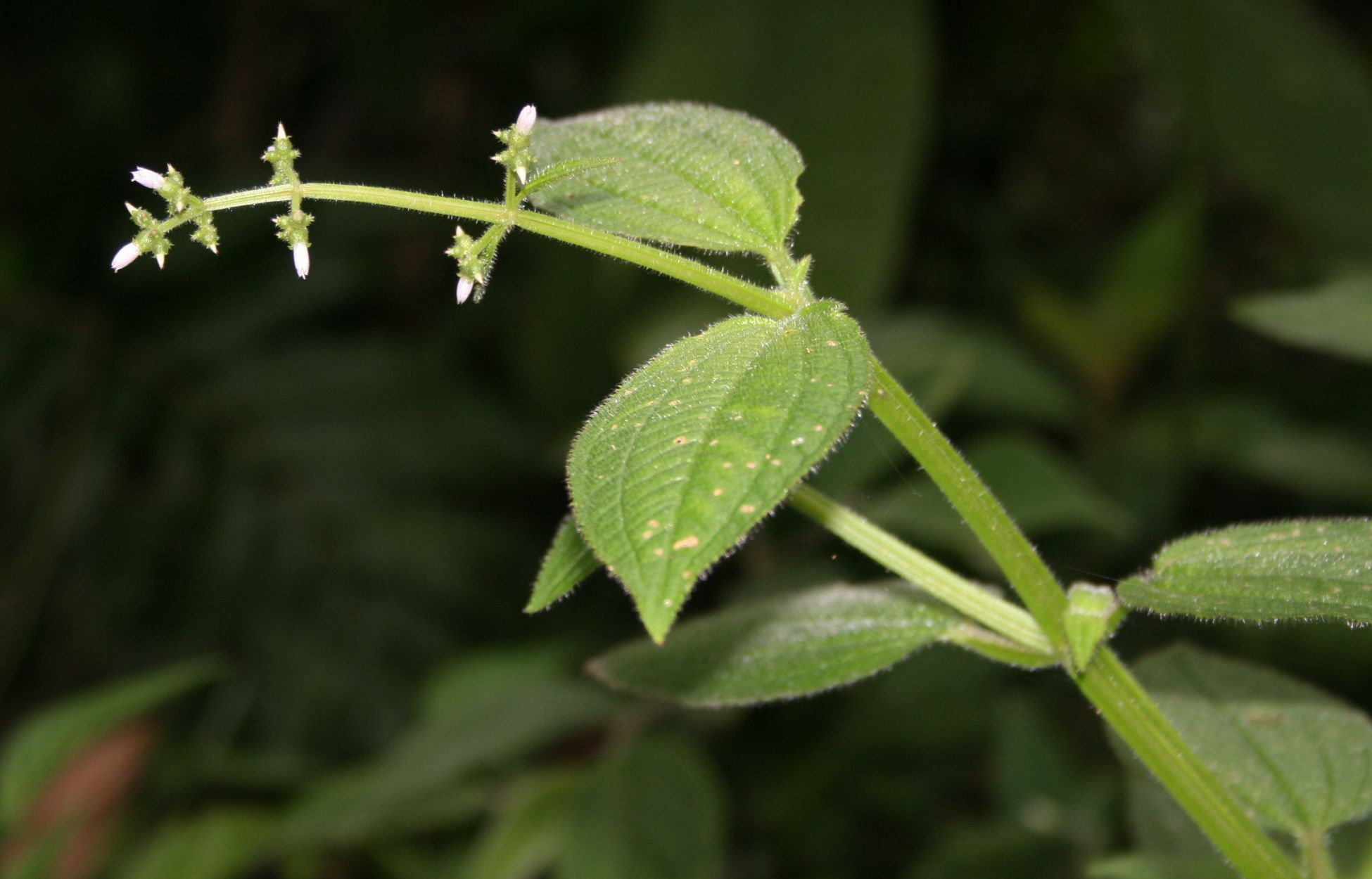

Conservation status
- Vulnerable (IUCN 3.1)

Scientific classification
- Kingdom: Plantae
- Clade: Tracheophytes
- Clade: Angiosperms
- Clade: Eudicots
- Clade: Rosids
- Order: Myrtales
- Family: Melastomataceae
- Genus: Aciotis
- Species: A. rubricaulis

Binomial name
- Aciotis rubricaulis (Mart. ex DC.) Triana

Synonyms
- Aciotis alata (Beurl.) Almeda; Aciotis aristata Ule; Aciotis aristellata Markgr.; Aciotis asplundii Wurdack; Aciotis caulialata (Naudin) Triana; Aciotis levyana Cogn.; Aciotis purpurascens var. alata Cogn.; Aciotis purpurascens var. martinensis J.F.Macbr.; Arthrostemma caulialatum Ruiz & Pav.; Spennera alata Beurl.; Spennera caulialata Naudin; Spennera panicularis Naudin; Spennera rubricaulis Mart. ex DC. (1828)

= Aciotis rubricaulis =

Species of flowering plant

Aciotis rubricaulis is a species of flowering plant in the family Melastomataceae. It is native to tropical Central America and South America, ranging from Guatemala to Bolivia and northeastern Brazil. Its natural habitat is tropical moist forests. It is used as a medicine.

The IUCN Red List assesses synonym A. asplundii as Vulnerable, and synonym A. aristellata as Endangered.
