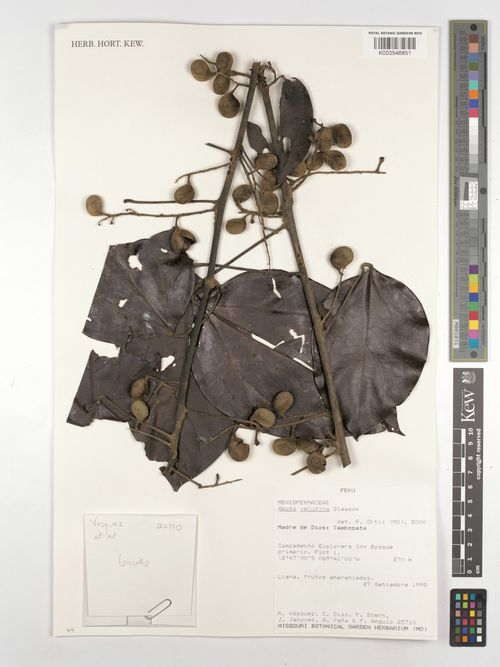

Conservation status
- Least Concern (IUCN 3.1)

Scientific classification
- Kingdom: Plantae
- Clade: Embryophytes
- Clade: Tracheophytes
- Clade: Spermatophytes
- Clade: Angiosperms
- Clade: Eudicots
- Order: Ranunculales
- Family: Menispermaceae
- Genus: Abuta
- Species: A. velutina

Binomial name
- Abuta velutina Gleason

= Abuta velutina =

Species of flowering plant

Abuta velutina is a species of flowering plant in the family Menispermaceae. It is native to a broad area of South America.

Abuta velutina is a tree or climbing plant, with velvety branches, subleathery leaves and obliquely ellipsoid fruits.

The species was described in 1931. Its conservation status is Least Concern.

== Taxonomy ==
Henry A. Gleason described Abuta velutina in 1931.

== Distribution ==
Abuta velutina is native to the wet tropical biome of Brazil, Ecuador, Peru, and Venezuela. Its estimated extent of occurrence is 3,969,697 square kilometres (1,532,709 sq mi).

== Description ==
Abuta velutina is a climber, or a tree around 25 feet (7.6 m) high. The smaller branches are straight, somewhat cylindrical, and thinly velvety.

The leaves are subleathery, approximately oval-shaped, 9–10 centimetres (3.5–3.9 in) long, and 7.5–8.5 centimetres (3.0–3.3 in) wide when mature. The leaf stems are slender, swollen at the base and apex, and 6–8 centimetres (2.4–3.1 in) long.

The inflorescences have fifteen to twenty flowers. The flower stalks are woody, and 6–8 millimetres (0.24–0.31 in) long. The fruits are obliquely ellipsoid in shape, grey and velvety. The fruits are 2.5–3 centimetres (0.98–1.18 in) long.

Abuta velutina resembles Abuta imene, but the former has broader leaves.

== Conservation ==
In 2023, the IUCN assessed Abuta velutina as of Least Concern. It has a large, stable, population, and faces no major threats. The species is present in protected areas.
