= Abuta acutifolia =

Scientific classification
- Kingdom: Plantae
- Clade: Tracheophytes
- Clade: Angiosperms
- Clade: Eudicots
- Order: Ranunculales
- Family: Menispermaceae
- Genus: Abuta
- Species: A. acutifolia

Binomial name
- Abuta acutifolia Miers

Species of plant

Abuta acutifolia is a species of flowering plant in the family Menispermaceae. The species was first described by botanist John Miers in 1864. It is endemic to Brazil.

The Abuta vine is characterized by its woody stems and heart-shaped leaves that grow in an alternate pattern along the vine. Its small, greenish-yellow flowers typically bloom in clusters. The plant's fruits are small, spherical, and turn red when ripe. Abuta acutifolia is known for its climbing habit, often winding its way up trees in its natural habitat.
