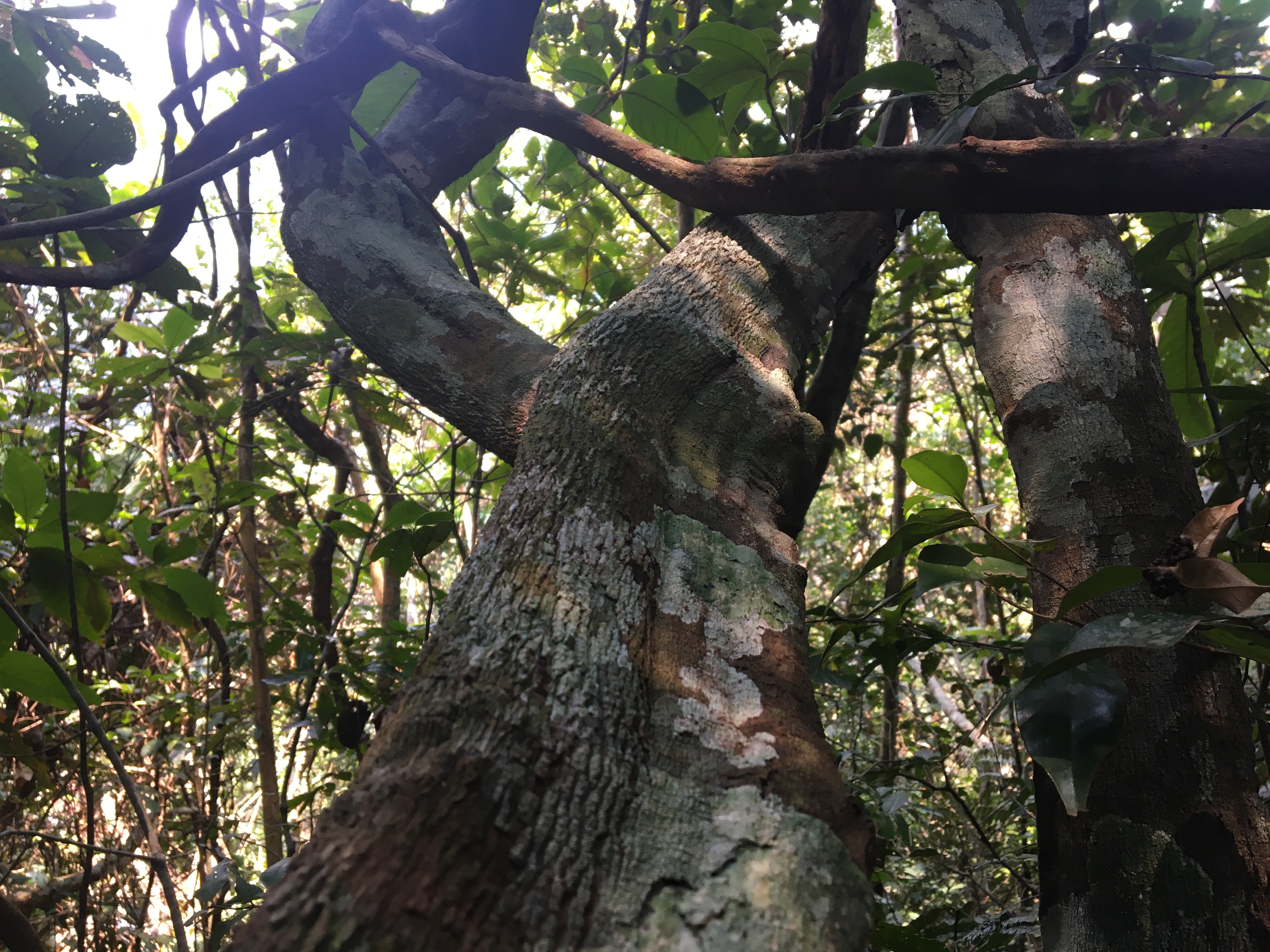

Conservation status
- Least Concern (IUCN 3.1)

Scientific classification
- Kingdom: Plantae
- Clade: Embryophytes
- Clade: Tracheophytes
- Clade: Angiosperms
- Clade: Eudicots
- Order: Ranunculales
- Family: Menispermaceae
- Genus: Abuta
- Species: A. grandifolia

Binomial name
- Abuta grandifolia (Mart.) Sandwith

Synonyms
- Synonymy: Cocculus grandifolius Mart.; Abuta concolor Poepp. & Endl.; Abuta guianensis Eichler; Anelasma concolor (Poepp. & Endl.) Miers; Anelasma gardnerianum Miers; Anelasma guianense Miers; Anelasma laurifolium Miers; Anelasma laurifolium Sagot ex Diels; Anelasma laurifolium Sagot ex Benth.; Anelasma martianum Miers; Anelasma pallidum Miers; Anelasma spruceanum Miers ex Benth.; Cocculus laevigatus Mart.; Trichoa concolor Endl. ex Walp.; Trichoa guyanensis Klotzsch ex Eichler

= Abuta grandifolia =

Species of flowering plant

Abuta grandifolia is a species of tree in the family Menispermaceae. It is found across much of South America, and has a stable population.

Abuta grandifolia provides food for several other species. It is used in medicine.

== Distribution ==
Abuta grandifolia has a wide distribution in the wet tropical biome of South America. The species is found in Bolivia, Brazil, Colombia, Ecuador, French Guiana, Guyana, Peru, Suriname, and Venezuela. It has an estimated extent of occupancy of 2,840 square kilometres (1,100 sq mi).

== Ecology ==
Abuta grandifolia is eaten by maned wolves, the Marail guan, and the black curassow.

== Conservation ==
In 2018, the IUCN assessed Abuta grandifolia as Least Concern. The population is stable, and faces no significant threats.

== Nomenclature ==
In 1830, Carl Friedrich Philipp von Martius described Abuta grandifolia as Cocculus grandifolius. The species received its current name in 1937.

In Portuguese, the species is known as catuabinha, pitomba da mata, catuaba, xexuá, or pitomba da folha dura. In Peru's Chazuta District, it is known as Achuni kaspi.

== Uses ==
Abuta grandifolia is used for food and medicine. The people of Peru's Chazuta District use the stems and roots, macerated in rum, to treat rheumatism, and as an aphrodisiac. Its use is governed by the doctrine of signatures.
