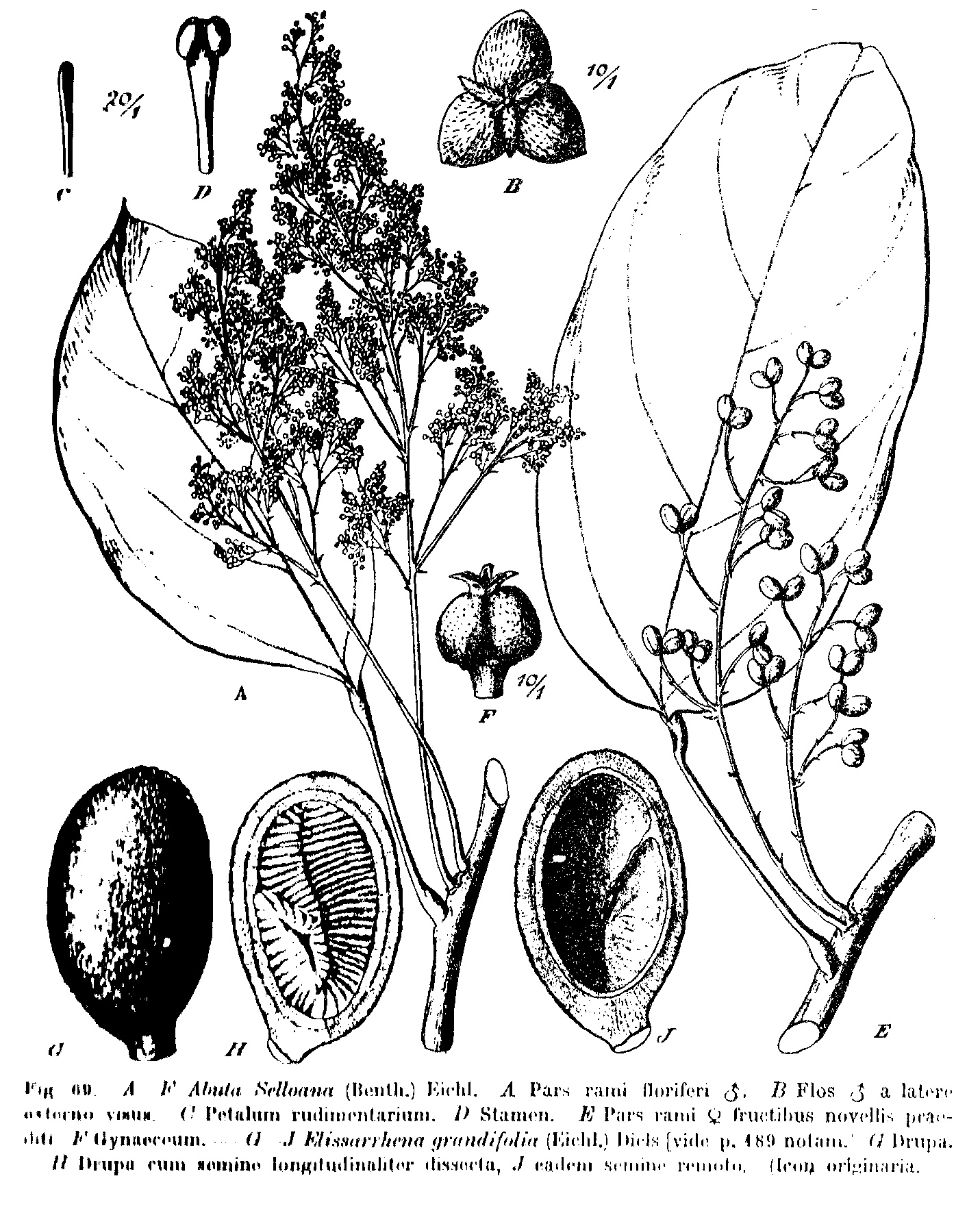
- Abuta selloana: Illustrations A-F from A. Engler, Das Pflanzenreich 46

Scientific classification
- Kingdom: Plantae
- Clade: Embryophytes
- Clade: Tracheophytes
- Clade: Spermatophytes
- Clade: Angiosperms
- Clade: Eudicots
- Order: Ranunculales
- Family: Menispermaceae
- Genus: Abuta; Aubl.

Species
- See text

= Abuta =

Genus of flowering plants

Abuta is a genus in the flowering plant family Menispermaceae, with thirty-four species, native to tropical Central and South America.

== Description ==
The genus consists of dioecious climbers or rarely erect trees or shrubs (Abuta grandifolia) with simple leaves. The flowers are in composed panicles. Male flowers have six sepals, in two whorls, no petals , six stamens (which are connate or free, and introrse), and anthers with a longitudinal or transverse dehiscence. Female flowers have sepals and petals as in the male, six staminodes, three carpels, ovoid drupes, a woody endocarp, a septiform condyle, a ruminate endosperm, a curved embryo, and appressed cotyledons. It inhabits tropical rain forests.

== Taxonomy ==
Abuta is usually classified in the tribe Anomospermeae Miers, together with Anomospermum Miers.

=== Synonymy ===
The genera Anelasma Miers and Batschia Thunb. have been brought into synonymy with Abuta.

== Uses ==
Abuta is one of the components of the arrow poison curare of some indigenous tribes of South America (especially Abuta imene from Colombia). Roots of Abuta rufescens are used as medicinal in diseases of the urogenital tract, but it is dangerous.

== Species ==
Species accepted by Plants of the World Online as of March 2024:

- Abuta acutifolia Miers
- Abuta alto-macahensis Feliz & J.M.A.Braga
- Abuta antioquiana Krukoff & Barneby
- Abuta aristeguietae Kurkoff & Barneby
- Abuta barbata Miers
- Abuta brevifolia Krukoff & Moldenke
- Abuta bullata Moldenke
- Abuta candollei Triana & Planch.
- Abuta chiapasensis Krukoff & Barneby
- Abuta chocoensis Krukoff & Barneby
- Abuta colombiana Moldenke
- Abuta dwyeriana Krukoff & Barneby
- Abuta fluminum Krukoff & Barneby
- Abuta grandifolia (Mart.) Sandwith
- Abuta grisebachii Triana & Planch.
- Abuta imene (Mart.) Eichler
- Abuta longa Krukoff & Barneby
- Abuta mycetandra Krukoff & Barneby
- Abuta obovata Diels
- Abuta pahni (Mart.) Krukoff & Barneby
- Abuta panamensis (Standl.) Krukoff & Barneby
- Abuta panurensis Eichler
- Abuta platyphylla Mart. ex Eichler
- Abuta racemosa Triana & Planch.
- Abuta rufescens Aubl.
- Abuta sandwithiana Krukoff & Barneby
- Abuta seemannii Triana & Planch.
- Abuta selloana Eichler
- Abuta solimoesensis Krukoff & Barneby
- Abuta soukupii Moldenke
- Abuta spicata (Thunb.) Triana & Planch.
- Abuta steyermarkii (Standl.) Standl.
- Abuta vaupesensis Krukoff & Barneby
- Abuta velutina Gleason
