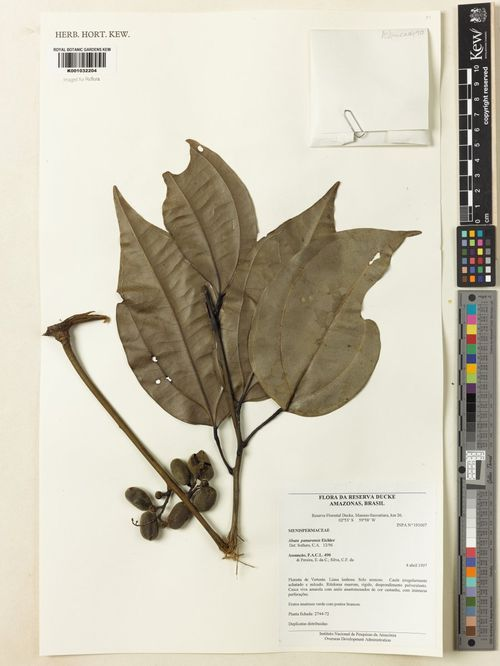

Scientific classification
- Kingdom: Plantae
- Clade: Embryophytes
- Clade: Tracheophytes
- Clade: Spermatophytes
- Clade: Angiosperms
- Clade: Eudicots
- Order: Ranunculales
- Family: Menispermaceae
- Genus: Abuta
- Species: A. panurensis

Binomial name
- Abuta panurensis Eichler

Synonyms
- Abuta acutifolia Miers

= Abuta panurensis =

Species of flowering plant

Abuta panurensis is a species of flowering plant in the family Menispermaceae. It is a climbing plant.

The species was described by August W. Eichler in 1864.

== Distribution ==
Abuta panurensis is native to the wet tropical biome of northern and west-central Brazil. It is not endemic to Brazil. The species is found in flooded forests, including Igapó forests.
