= Triolena campii =

Conservation status
- Endangered (IUCN 3.1)

Scientific classification
- Kingdom: Plantae
- Clade: Tracheophytes
- Clade: Angiosperms
- Clade: Eudicots
- Clade: Rosids
- Order: Myrtales
- Family: Melastomataceae
- Genus: Triolena
- Species: T. campii

Binomial name
- Triolena campii (Wurdack) Wurdack

Species of flowering plant

Triolena campii is a species of plant in the family Melastomataceae. It is endemic to Ecuador.
