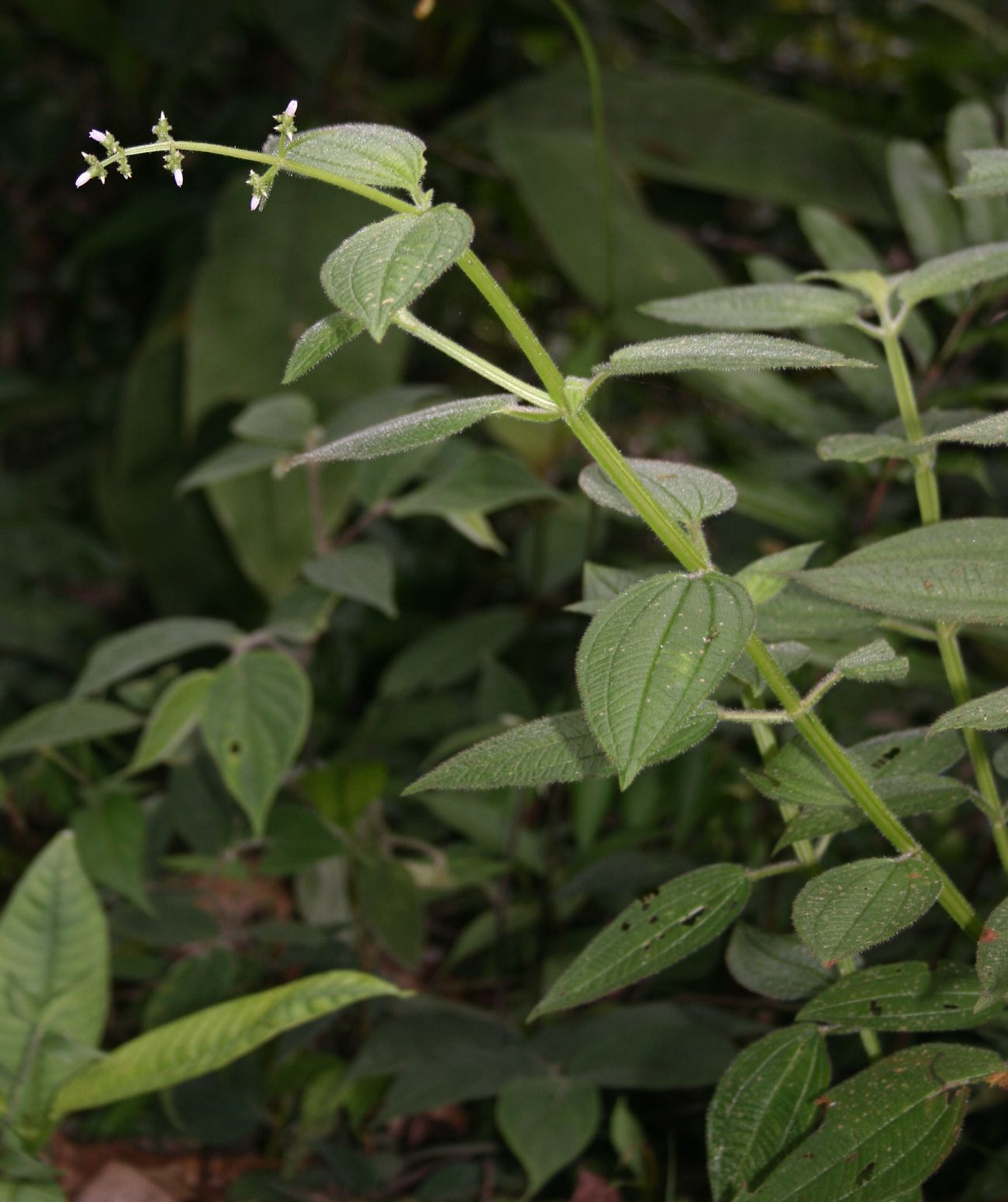
- Aciotis rubricaulis

Scientific classification
- Kingdom: Plantae
- Clade: Tracheophytes
- Clade: Angiosperms
- Clade: Eudicots
- Clade: Rosids
- Order: Myrtales
- Family: Melastomataceae
- Genus: Aciotis; D.Don

Synonyms
- Spennera Mart. ex DC.

= Aciotis =

Genus of flowering plants

Aciotis is a genus of flowering plants in the family Melastomataceae. The genus was first described in 1823 by David Don.

There are about 15 species distributed from Mexico to Brazil.

== Species ==
15 species are accepted.

- Aciotis acuminifolia (Mart. ex DC.) Triana
- Aciotis annua (Mart. ex DC.) Triana
- Aciotis circaeifolia (Bonpl.) Triana
- Aciotis cordata J.F.Macbr.
- Aciotis ferreirana Brade
- Aciotis indecora (Bonpl.) Triana
- Aciotis olivieriana Freire-Fierro
- Aciotis ornata (Miq.) Gleason
- Aciotis paludosa (Mart. ex DC.) Triana
- Aciotis pendulifolia (Bonpl.) Triana
- Aciotis polystachya (Bonpl.) Triana
- Aciotis purpurascens (Aubl.) Triana
- Aciotis rubricaulis (Mart. ex DC.) Triana
- Aciotis viscida (Benth.) Freire-Fierro
- Aciotis wurdackiana Freire-Fierro
