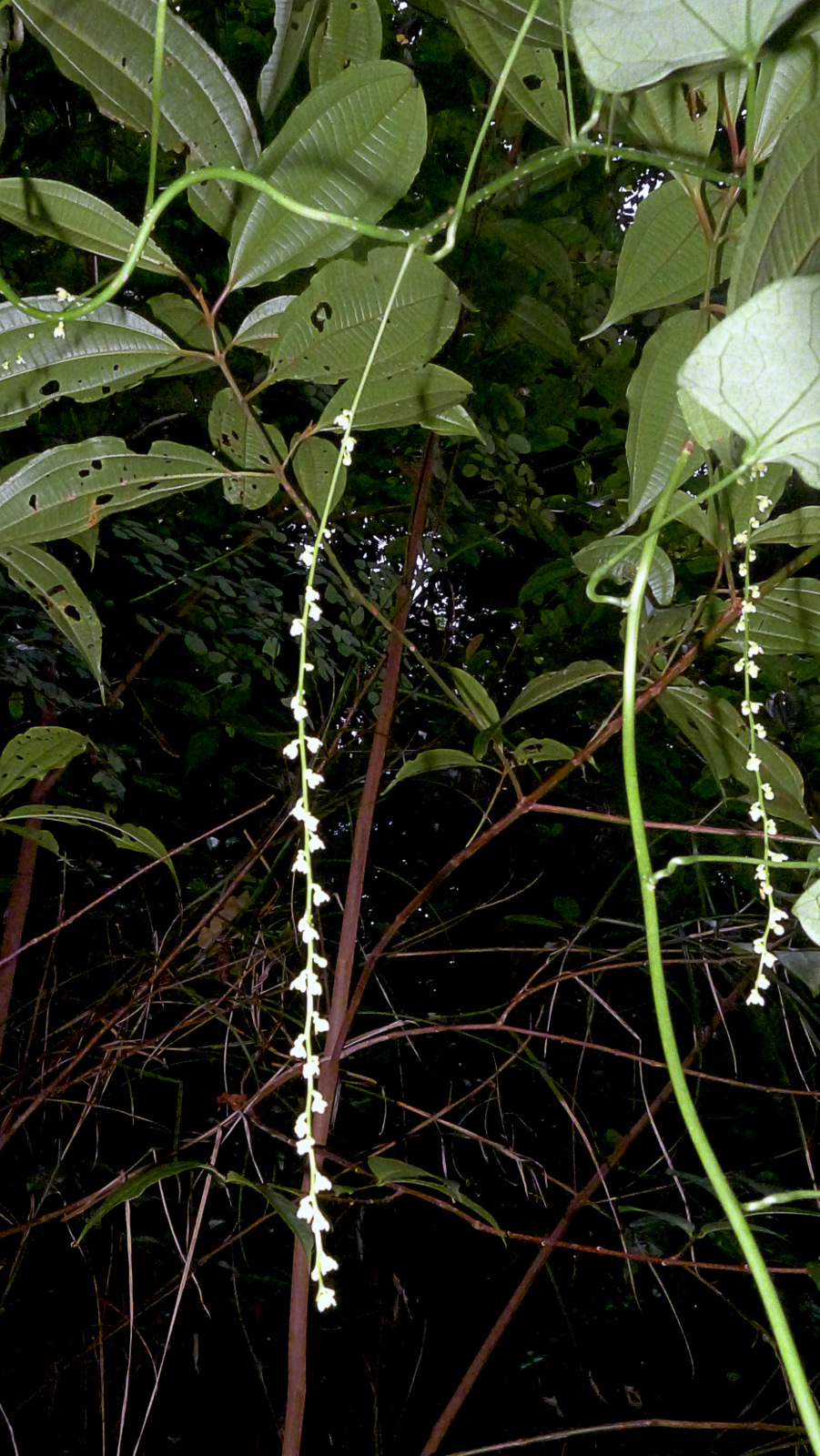

Scientific classification
- Kingdom: Plantae
- Clade: Tracheophytes
- Clade: Angiosperms
- Clade: Eudicots
- Order: Ranunculales
- Family: Menispermaceae
- Genus: Odontocarya; Miers (1851)

Species
- 38; see text

Synonyms
- Heterotypic Synonyms: Somphoxylon Eichler; Synandropus A.C.Sm.

= Odontocarya =

Genus of flowering plants

Odontocarya is a genus of flowering plants in the family Menispermaceae. It is native to Argentina, Belize, Bolivia, Brazil, Colombia, Costa Rica, Ecuador, El Salvador, French Guiana, Guyana, Honduras, the Leeward Islands, Mexico, Panama, Paraguay, Peru, Suriname, Venezuela, and the Windward Islands.

== Species ==
Accepted species in the genus include:

- Odontocarya acuparata Miers
- Odontocarya amazonum Barneby
- Odontocarya asarifolia Barneby
- Odontocarya deminuta (Diels) Barneby
- Odontocarya dielsiana Barneby
- Odontocarya diplobotrya Diels
- Odontocarya duckei Barneby
- Odontocarya echinus Barneby
- Odontocarya emarginata Barneby
- Odontocarya floribunda Diels
- Odontocarya froesii Barneby
- Odontocarya hastata Barneby
- Odontocarya klugii (A.C.Sm.) Barneby
- Odontocarya krukoviana Barneby
- Odontocarya macarenae Barneby
- Odontocarya magnifolia (A.C.Sm.) Barneby
- Odontocarya mallosperma Barneby
- Odontocarya membranacea (A.C.Sm.) R.Ortiz
- Odontocarya mexicana Barneby
- Odontocarya micrantha (Diels) Barneby
- Odontocarya miersiana Barneby
- Odontocarya monandra Barneby
- Odontocarya perforata Barneby
- Odontocarya petiolaris Barneby
- Odontocarya rusbyi Barneby
- Odontocarya schimpffii Diels
- Odontocarya septemfida Barneby
- Odontocarya smithiorum Diels
- Odontocarya steyermarkii Barneby
- Odontocarya syncretica Barneby
- Odontocarya tamoides (DC.) Miers
- Odontocarya tenacissima Diels
- Odontocarya tripetala Diels
- Odontocarya truncata Standl.
- Odontocarya ulei Diels
- Odontocarya vitis (Vell.) Miers ex B.D.Jacks.
- Odontocarya wullschlaegelii (Eichler) Barneby
- Odontocarya zuliana Barneby
