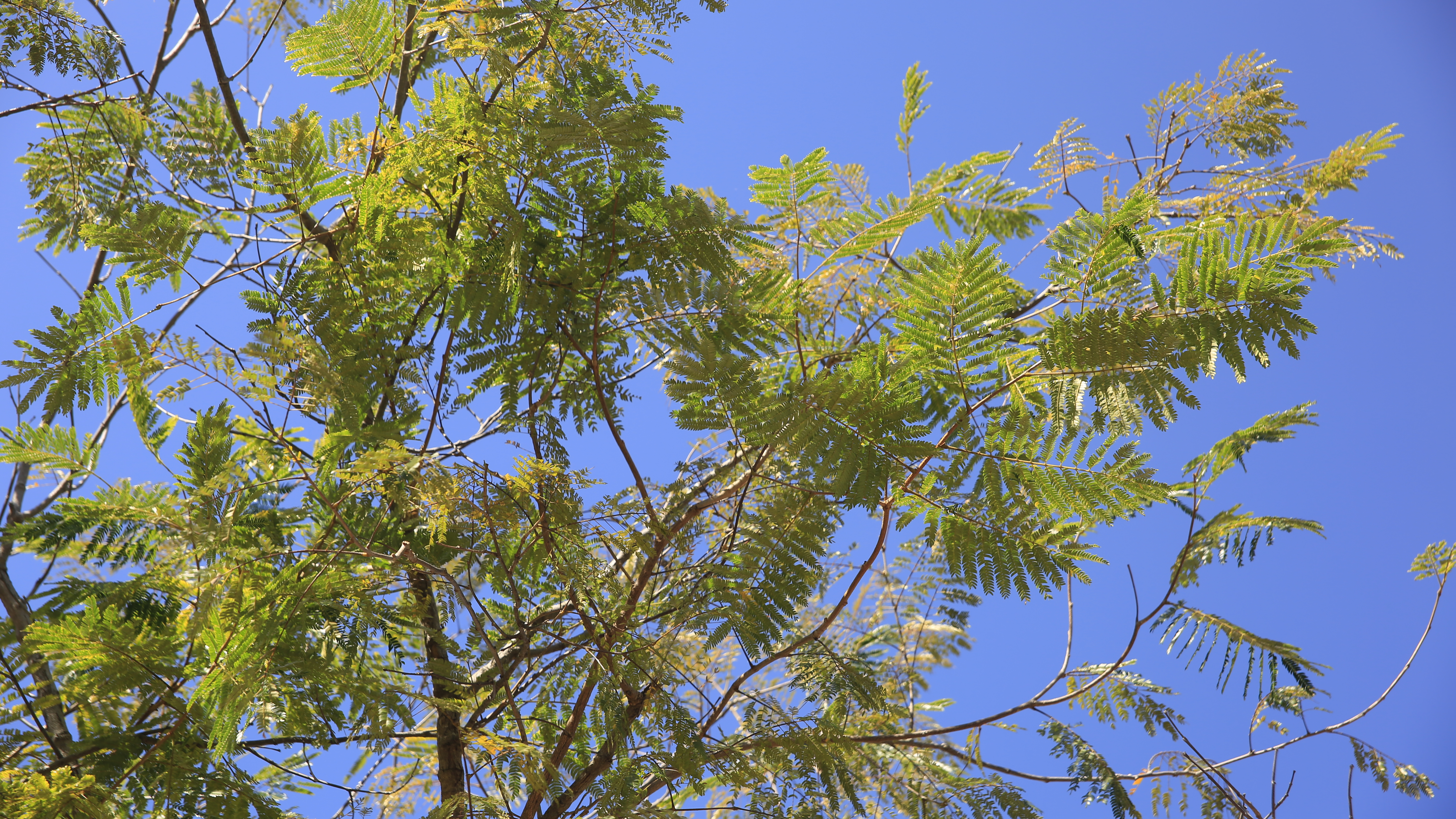
- Leucochloron incuriale

Scientific classification
- Kingdom: Plantae
- Clade: Tracheophytes
- Clade: Angiosperms
- Clade: Eudicots
- Clade: Rosids
- Order: Fabales
- Family: Fabaceae
- Subfamily: Caesalpinioideae
- Clade: Mimosoid clade
- Genus: Leucochloron; Barneby & J.W.Grimes (1996)

Species
- Leucochloron foederale (Barneby & J.W.Grimes) Barneby & J.W.Grimes; Leucochloron incuriale (Vell.) Barneby & J.W.Grimes; Leucochloron limae Barneby & J.W.Grimes; Leucochloron minarum (Glaz. & Harms) Barneby & J.W.Grimes

= Leucochloron =

Genus of legumes

Leucochloron is a genus of flowering plant in the family Fabaceae. It includes four species native to Brazil. It belongs to the mimosoid clade of the subfamily Caesalpinioideae.

- Leucochloron foederale (Barneby & J.W.Grimes) Barneby & J.W.Grimes – west-central and southeastern Brazil
- Leucochloron incuriale (Vell.) Barneby & J.W.Grimes – southeastern and southern Brazil
- Leucochloron limae Barneby & J.W.Grimes – northeastern Brazil (Bahia)
- Leucochloron minarum (Glaz. & Harms) Barneby & J.W.Grimes – eastern Brazil
