= Borismene =

Scientific classification
- Kingdom: Plantae
- Clade: Embryophytes
- Clade: Tracheophytes
- Clade: Angiosperms
- Clade: Eudicots
- Order: Ranunculales
- Family: Menispermaceae
- Genus: Borismene; Barneby
- Species: B. japurensis

Binomial name
- Borismene japurensis (Mart.) Barneby

Synonyms
- Anomospermum japurense (Mart.) Eichler; Cocculus japurensis Mart.; Hyperbaena cuatrecasasii Moldenke

Genus of flowering plants

Borismene is a monotypic genus of flowering plants in the family Menispermaceae native to the Amazon rainforest. Plants of the World Online recognises the single species Borismene japurensis.
