= Abuta dwyeriana =

Scientific classification
- Kingdom: Plantae
- Clade: Embryophytes
- Clade: Tracheophytes
- Clade: Spermatophytes
- Clade: Angiosperms
- Clade: Eudicots
- Order: Ranunculales
- Family: Menispermaceae
- Genus: Abuta
- Species: A. dwyeriana

Binomial name
- Abuta dwyeriana Krukoff & Barneby

Species of plant

Abuta dwyeriana is a species of the Abuta genus, which is part of the flowering plant family Menispermaceae.

== Description ==
Like most other Abuta species, A. dwyeriana is typically a dioecious climber, or rarely an erect tree or shrub. It has simple leaves and its flowers are in composed panicles. The male flowers have six sepals in two whorls, six stamens that can be either connate or free, and anthers with a longitudinal or transverse dehiscence. The female flowers have sepals and petals similar to the male flowers, six staminodes, and three carpels. The drupes are ovoid, the endocarp is woody, the condyle is septiform, the endosperm is ruminate, and the embryo is curved. The species is found in the tropical rain forest.
