= Aciotis olivieriana =

Scientific classification
- Kingdom: Plantae
- Clade: Tracheophytes
- Clade: Angiosperms
- Clade: Eudicots
- Clade: Rosids
- Order: Myrtales
- Family: Melastomataceae
- Genus: Aciotis
- Species: A. olivieriana

Binomial name
- Aciotis olivieriana Freire-Fierro

Species of plant

Aciotis olivieriana is a plant species native to Colombia, Venezuela, Brazil, Ecuador and Peru. It occurs in disturbed habitats such as river banks, the edges of forests at elevations less than 1350 m.

Aciotis olivieriana is an erect or trailing herb up to 40 cm tall, sometimes reproducing by means of stolons running along the surface of the ground. Leaves have narrowly winged petioles up to 4 cm long; blades are heart-shaped, up to 5 cm long, dark green on the upper side, lighter green below because of hairs. Inflorescence is a compound cyme with many small purple flowers lacking the glands that are present on the petals of some related species.
