= Abuta bullata =

Scientific classification
- Kingdom: Plantae
- Clade: Embryophytes
- Clade: Tracheophytes
- Clade: Spermatophytes
- Clade: Angiosperms
- Clade: Eudicots
- Order: Ranunculales
- Family: Menispermaceae
- Genus: Abuta
- Species: A. bullata

Binomial name
- Abuta bullata Moldenke, Brittonia 3: 52 (1938)

Species of plant

Abuta bullata is a species in the genus Abuta, which is part of the flowering plant family Menispermaceae. It is a vine native to South America. It was first described in Brittonia in 1938.
