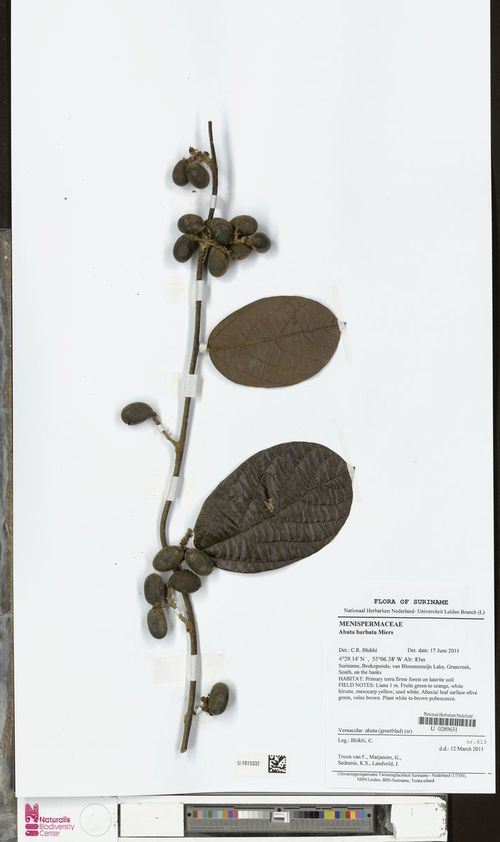

Scientific classification
- Kingdom: Plantae
- Clade: Embryophytes
- Clade: Tracheophytes
- Clade: Spermatophytes
- Clade: Angiosperms
- Clade: Eudicots
- Order: Ranunculales
- Family: Menispermaceae
- Genus: Abuta
- Species: A. barbata

Binomial name
- Abuta barbata Miers

= Abuta barbata =

Species of flowering plant

Abuta barbata is a species of flowering plant in the family Menispermaceae. It is a climbing plant native to northern South America.

The species was named by John Miers in 1864.

== Distribution ==
Abuta barbata is native to the wet tropical biome of northern South America (northern Brazil, French Guiana, Guyana, and Suriname). Within Brazil, it is present in the states of Acre and Pará.
