= Abuta platyphylla =

Scientific classification
- Kingdom: Plantae
- Clade: Embryophytes
- Clade: Tracheophytes
- Clade: Spermatophytes
- Clade: Angiosperms
- Clade: Eudicots
- Order: Ranunculales
- Family: Menispermaceae
- Genus: Abuta
- Species: A. platyphylla

Binomial name
- Abuta platyphylla Mart. ex Eichler

Species of flowering plant

Abuta platyphylla is a species of flowering plant in the family Menispermaceae. It is a climbing plant native to Brazil. The species was first described in 1864.

== Distribution ==
Abuta platyphylla is native to the wet tropical biome of northern Brazil.

== Taxonomy ==
Carl Friedrich Philipp von Martius described Abuta platyphylla (as Botryopsis platyphylla) in Flora Brasiliensis. The description was published in 1864.

== Description ==
Abuta platyphylla is a climbing plant. The male flowers are pale green. They have long-narrow sepals, and oblong-elliptical petals.
