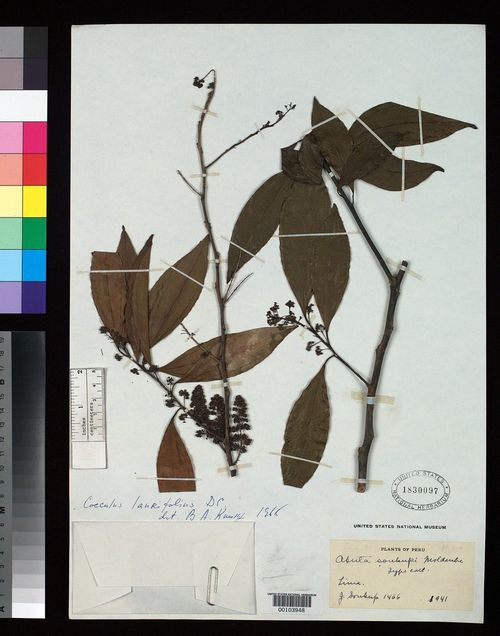

Scientific classification
- Kingdom: Plantae
- Clade: Embryophytes
- Clade: Tracheophytes
- Clade: Spermatophytes
- Clade: Angiosperms
- Clade: Eudicots
- Order: Ranunculales
- Family: Menispermaceae
- Genus: Abuta
- Species: A. soukupii

Binomial name
- Abuta soukupii Moldenke

= Abuta soukupii =

Species of flowering plant

Abuta soukupii, commonly known as the laurel-leaf snailseed is a species of flowering plant in the family Menispermaceae. It is a climbing plant with narrowly elliptical leaves.

It is native to Peru, and was described in 1947.

== Distribution ==
Abuta soukupii is native to the wet tropical biome of Peru.

== Taxonomy ==
Abuta soukupii was named by Harold Norman Moldenke in 1947. The type specimen was collected in Lima, Peru, in 1941.

== Description ==
Abuta soukupii is a climbing plant. It is woody, and has slender branches with sharp ridges.

The leaves are narrowly elliptical, 8–15 centimetres (3.1–5.9 in) long, and 2–4 centimetres (0.79–1.57 in) wide. They are hairless, shiny, and have a slender midrib. The leaves are arranged alternately. They grow on slender petioles, which are 7–12 millimetres (0.28–0.47 in) long.

The male inflorescences are 3.5–10 centimetres (1.4–3.9 in) long, and 1.5–2 centimetres (0.59–0.79 in) wide. The flowers are attached with slender, 1–3 millimetres (0.039–0.118 in) long stalks. The longer inflorescences often have leaves, which are slightly smaller than those on the stem.

The three outer sepals are membranous, elliptical, and around 1 millimetre (0.039 in) long. The three inner sepals are membranous, translucent at the margins and apex, around 1.7 millimetres (0.067 in) long, and around 1.3 millimetres (0.051 in) wide.
