= Annales des Sciences Naturelles =

Annales des sciences naturelles
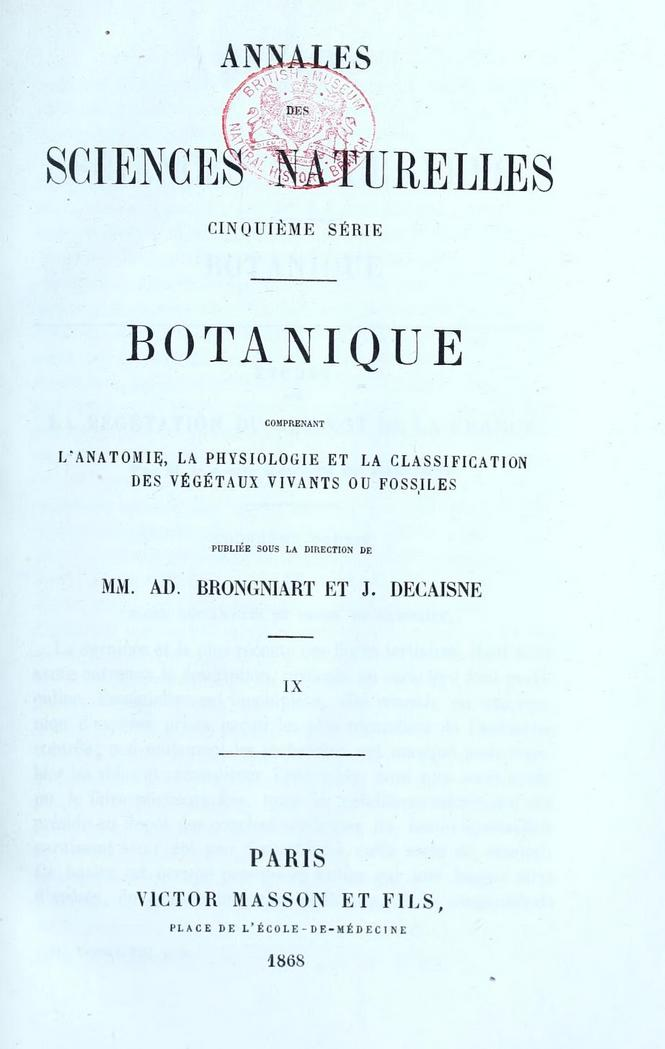
- Title page of Series 5, Volume 9 (1868)
- Discipline: Zoology, Botany, Anatomy
- Language: French

Publication details
- History: 1824-1937 (209 volumes in 10 series)

Standard abbreviations
- ISO 4: Ann. Sci. Nat.

Indexing
- ISSN: 0150-9306

Links
- Journal homepage

Annales des Sciences Naturelles (Paris) was a scientific journal with botanical descriptions published in Paris. In a first series, thirty volumes were published in the years 1824-1833, under the name of Annales des sciences naturelles; comprenant la physiologie animale et végétale, l'anatomie comparée des deux règnes, zoologie, botanique, minéralogue et la géologie. Paris. After that, at least 8 follow-up series were issued under the names Annales des Sciences Naturelles; Botanique, ser. XXX, most of them comprising 20 volumes and in 10 years. See the table for details.

Details of the journal series
Series	Years		Number of
	From	To	Volumes
1	1824	1833	30
2	1834	1843	20
3	1844	1853	20
4	1854	1863	20
5	1864	1874	20
6	1875	1885	20
7	1885	1895	20
8	1895	1904	20
9	1905	1917	20
10	1919	1937	19
