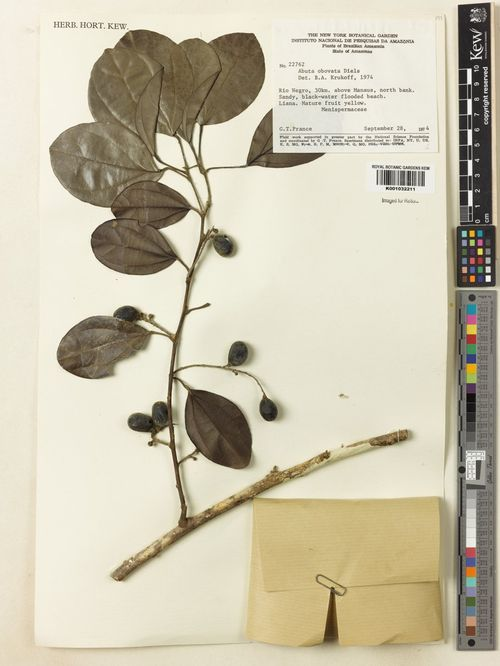

Scientific classification
- Kingdom: Plantae
- Clade: Embryophytes
- Clade: Tracheophytes
- Clade: Spermatophytes
- Clade: Angiosperms
- Clade: Eudicots
- Order: Ranunculales
- Family: Menispermaceae
- Genus: Abuta
- Species: A. obovata

Binomial name
- Abuta obovata Diels

= Abuta obovata =

Species of flowering plant

Abuta obovata is a species of climbing plant in the family Menispermaceae. It is a shrub or climbing plant native to South America. The species produces drupes.

Ludwig Diels described Abuta obovata in 1936.

== Distribution ==
Abuta obovata is found in the wet tropical biome of northern Brazil, Colombia, French Guiana, Guyana, Peru, Suriname, and Venezuela.

== Description ==
Abuta obovata is a climbing plant, or shrub. The flowers are white.

The fruits are ovoid drupes, which are 1.8–2.3 centimetres (0.71–0.91 in) long, and 1.1–1.3 centimetres (0.43–0.51 in) wide. The exocarp (outer layer of the fruit) has minute hairs. The fleshy portion between the exocarp and the seed is thin. The seed is surrounded by a brittle stony layer (the endocarp), which is at most 0.3 millimetres (0.012 in) thick.

== Uses ==
Abuta obovata is used for food.
