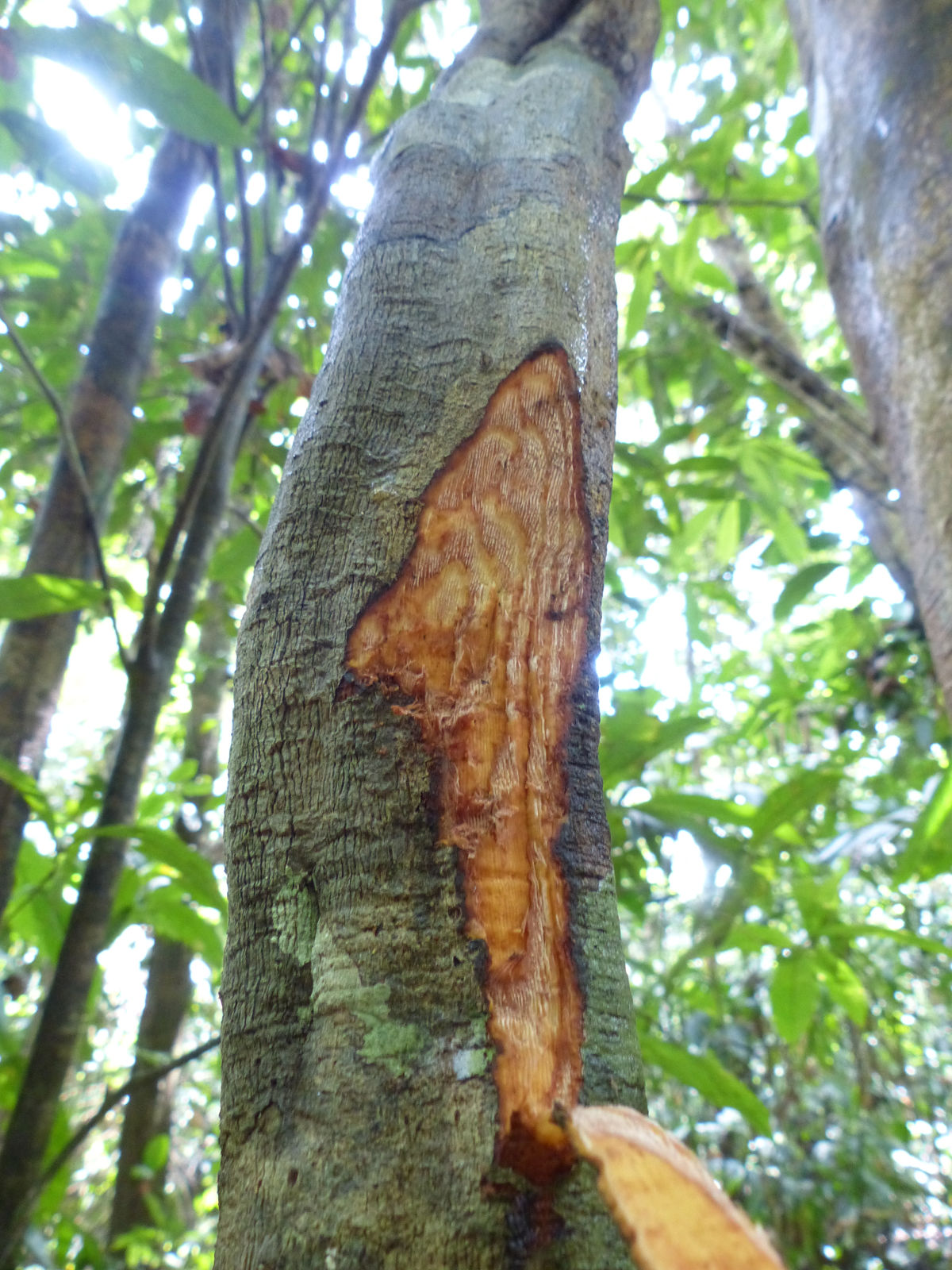

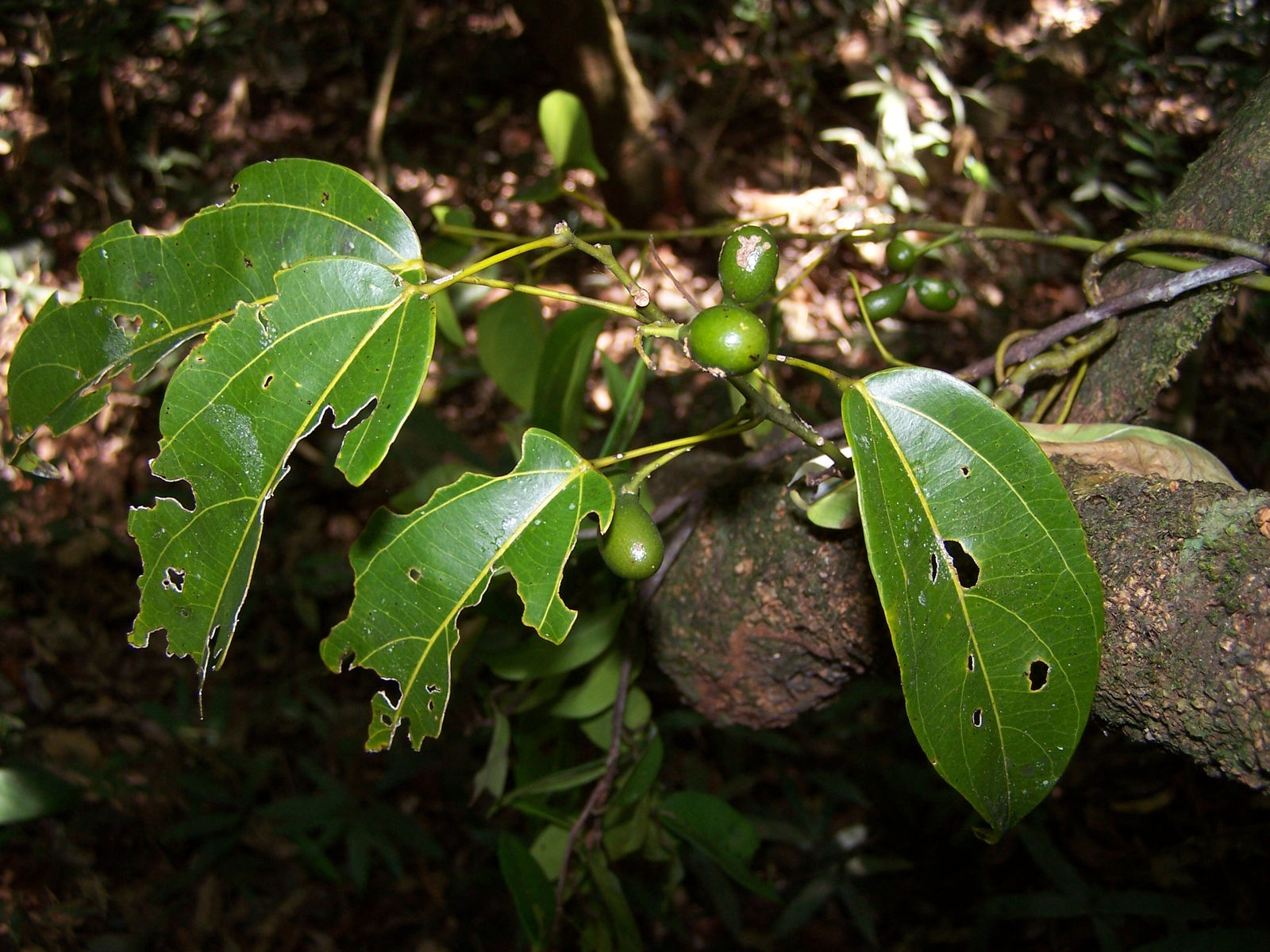

Conservation status
- Least Concern (IUCN 3.1)

Scientific classification
- Kingdom: Plantae
- Clade: Embryophytes
- Clade: Tracheophytes
- Clade: Spermatophytes
- Clade: Angiosperms
- Clade: Eudicots
- Order: Ranunculales
- Family: Menispermaceae
- Genus: Abuta
- Species: A. imene

Binomial name
- Abuta imene (Mart.) Eichler

Synonyms
- Cocculus imene Mart.; Abuta klugii Moldenke; Abuta trinervis (Rusby) Moldenke; Cocculus amazonum Mart. ex Herberger; Hyperbaena trinervis Rusby

= Abuta imene =

Species of flowering plant

Abuta imene is a species of climbing plant or tree in the family Menispermaceae. It was first described in 1830. The species occurs across much of South America, and is classified as Least Concern.

== Taxonomy ==
Abuta imene was described in 1830, as Cocculus imene and Cocculus amazonum. It was given its current name in 1864.

== Distribution ==
Abuta imene is native to South America (Bolivia, Brazil, Colombia, Ecuador, French Guiana, Guyana, Peru, Suriname, and Venezuela). It has a wide distribution, and its estimated area of occurrence is 6,676,113.86 square kilometres (2,577,661.97 sq mi).

== Conservation ==
In 2018, the IUCN assessed Abuta imene as of Least Concern. The population is large, stable, and faces no major threats.

== Uses ==
Abuta imene is used in medicine.
