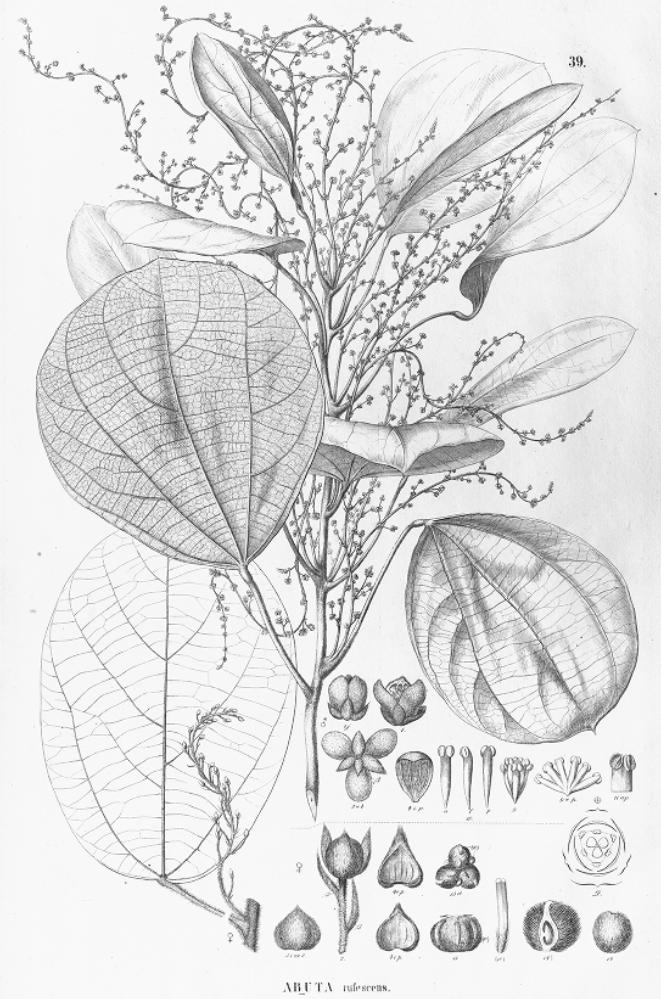
- Illustration

Conservation status
- Least Concern (IUCN 3.1)

Scientific classification
- Kingdom: Plantae
- Clade: Embryophytes
- Clade: Tracheophytes
- Clade: Spermatophytes
- Clade: Angiosperms
- Clade: Eudicots
- Order: Ranunculales
- Family: Menispermaceae
- Genus: Abuta
- Species: A. rufescens

Binomial name
- Abuta rufescens Aubl.

Synonyms
- Abuta convexa (Vell.) Diels; Abuta heterophylla Miers; Abuta macrophylla Miers; Abuta scandens DC.; Abuta splendida Krukoff & Moldenke; Abuta wilson-brownei R.S.Cowan; Cissampelos convexa Vell.; Cissampelos tomentosa Vell.; Cocculus abuta Kostel.; Cocculus tomentosus Mart. ex Eichler; Menispermum abuta Lam.

= Abuta rufescens =

Species of flowering plant

Abuta rufescens is a species of flowering plant in the family Menispermaceae. It is a climbing plant with large yellow flowers.

The species is native to South America, including Brazil, Colombia, Ecuador, French Guiana, Guyana, Peru, Suriname, and Venezuela. It has a wide distribution, and is of least concern.

Abuta rufescens has traditionally been used in medicine, and for the production of curare. The species' current name was first published in 1775.

== Distribution ==
Abuta rufescens is native to the wet tropical biome of South America. It is present in Bolivia, Brazil, Colombia, Ecuador, French Guiana, Guyana, Peru, Suriname, and Venezuela. Within Brazil, the species is present in Acre, Amazonas, Amapá, Pará, Rondônia, Roraima, Tocantins, Bahia, Mato Grosso, Espírito Santo, Minas Gerais, and Rio de Janeiro. Within Colombia, it is present in the departments of Amazonas, Cauca, and Putumayo.

Abuta rufescens is present at elevations of 100–600 metres (330–1,970 ft). Its estimated area of occurrence is 7,982,936.49 square kilometres (3,082,229.01 sq mi).

== Taxonomy ==
The species' current name was first published in 1775, by Jean Baptiste Christophore Fusée Aublet.

== Description ==
Abuta rufescens climbs from the rainforest canopy. The inflorescences are woolly, and have large yellow flowers. The leaves are 10–14.5 centimetres (3.9–5.7 in) long, and 8.5–19 centimetres (3.3–7.5 in) wide.

== Ecology ==
Abuta rufescens is a host of the fungus Lembosia decalvans.

== Conservation ==
In 2018, the IUCN assessed Abuta rufescens as of least concern, due to its large population, wide distribution, and a lack of major threats.

== Uses ==
Abuta rufescens has medicinal uses. It is traditionally used to treat angina, malaria, snake bites, intermittent fever, indigestion, and flatulence.

Indigenous people also used the plant in the preparation of curare.
