= José Jerónimo Triana =

Colombian botanist (1828–1890)

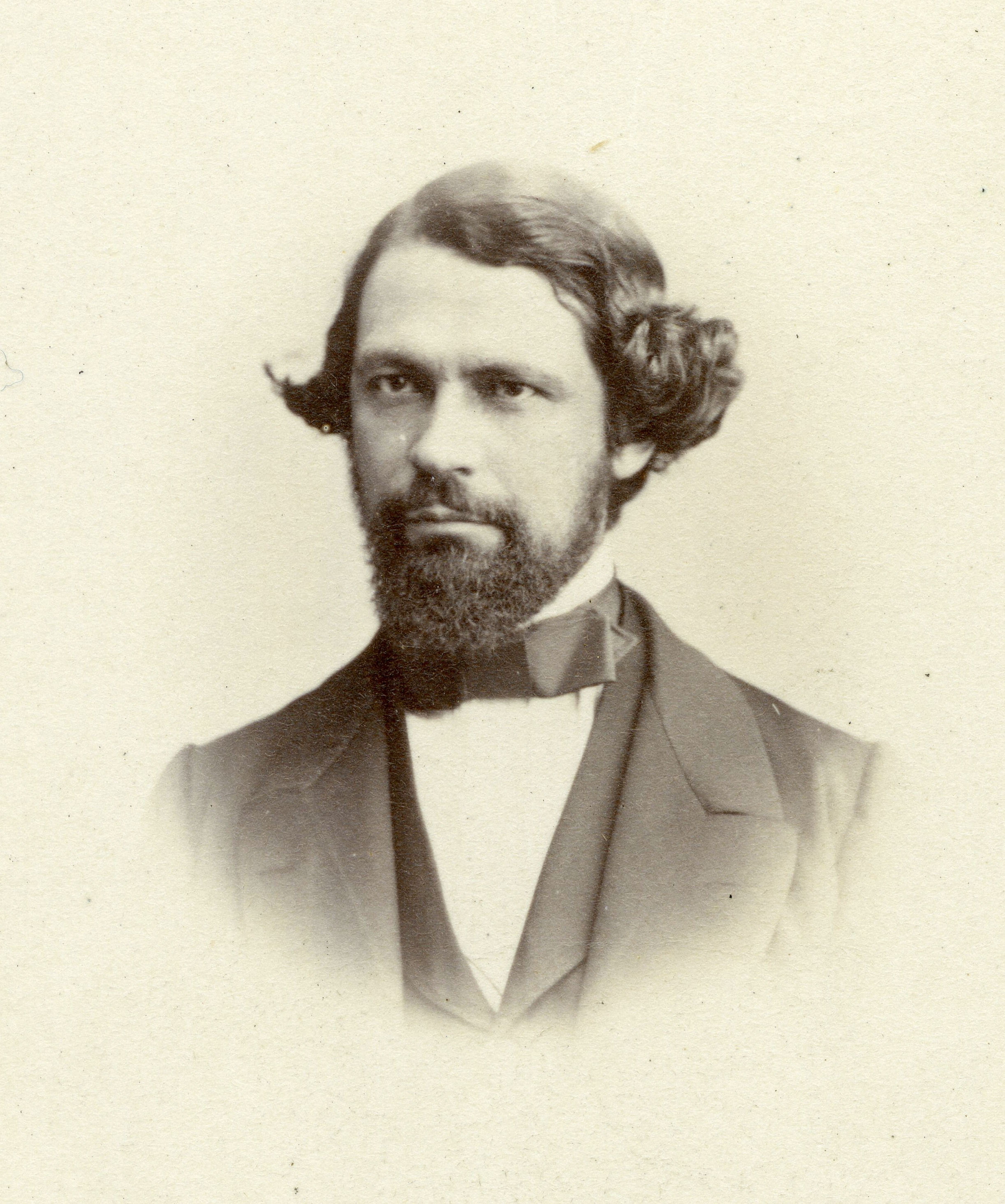
- In 1865
- Born: May 22, 1828; Bogotá, Colombia
- Died: October 31, 1890 (aged 62); Paris, France
- Scientific career
- Fields: Botany
- Author abbrev. (botany): Triana

José Jerónimo Triana Silva (May 22, 1828 in Bogotá – October 31, 1890 in Paris) was a Colombian botanist, explorer, and physician who cataloged over 60,000 specimens representing 8,000 species.

In 1851, he joined the Chorographic Commission as head of botany, which he served as until 1857. During this time he created an herbarium of over 2,200 herbal plants.

As a physician, he developed a line of pharmaceutical products marketed in France, among which are bandages to treat corns, powder toothpaste, and cough syrup. Like his father, Triana wrote several school books to learn to read and write that were used in schools in Colombia.

Triana died one day before the death of his daughter Liboria. After he died, his wife returned to Bogotá. She died in 1895.

== Published works ==
- New genera and species of plants for neogranadina flora (1855)
- Colombian flora (1856)
- Monograph of the garcinia (1856)

Example of species he cataloged include the following:

- Acisanthera alsinaefolia (DC.) Triana
- Miconia albicans (Sw.) Triana
- Miconia candolleana Triana
- Passiflora quadrangularis Triana and Planch
