= Boris Alexander Krukoff =

Russian-American botanist

- Born: August 1, 1898; Kazan or Minusinsk, Russia (Note: Sources disagree - Krukoff gave contradictory accounts)
- Died: January 19, 1983 (aged 84); Smithtown, New York, US
- Education: State University of New York College of Environmental Science and Forestry
- Spouses: Florence Barry (m. 1945; died 1974) Ruth Hodgins (m. 1975)
- Awards: See Awards
- Scientific career
- Fields: Botany
- Author abbrev. (botany): Krukoff

Boris Alexander Krukoff (1 August [O.S. 20 July] 1898 – January 19, 1983) was a Russian-American botanist.

Born in Russia in 1898, Krukoff participated in the Russian Civil War, and was briefly interned in the Philippines. After reaching the United States, Krukoff studied in Syracuse, New York. He lived in New York until his death in 1983.

Krukoff made expeditions to the Amazon basin, Africa, and Sumatra. Whilst in Brazil, he collected plants, and conducted industrial espionage. Later, Krukoff founded Caffco Drugs, worked on curare, and smuggled Cinchona calisaya seeds out of Bolivia. Beginning in 1960, Krukoff and his first wife managed plantations in Guatemala. Towards the end of his career, Krukoff endowed several botanic gardens, supporting the work of several notable botanists.

Krukoff received several awards, and is the namesake of Krukoviella and Borismene. He is the authority for 183 taxonomic names.

== Life ==
Sources on Krukoff's early life are mostly autobiographical, and some are contradictory. Krukoff may have denied parts of his biography to conceal war activities when applying for United States residency.

Krukoff was born on 1 August [O.S. 20 July] 1898, in either Kazan or Minusinsk, Russia. (Note: Sources disagree: In 1932, Krukoff claimed to have been born in "Minousinsk [Minusinsk], Eniseisk Province". In 1970, he claimed to have been born in Kazan, and denied that he was born in Minousinsk. The New York Times states that Krukoff was born in Kazan.) His parents were Alexander Ivan Krukoff, a botanist, and Eugenia Pavel Bichkoff. Krukoff had two sisters, one of whom was named Nina.

In August 1909, Krukoff entered the gymnasium in Kosmodemiansk, Kazan Province, Russia. He graduated with high honors in April 1917. Krukoff claimed, and later denied, that he worked as a forestry supervisor in the Kosmodemiansk National Forest (during the summers of 1914, 1915, and 1916).

=== Military service ===
In May 1917, aged 19, Krukoff joined the Alexander Military Law Academy. He graduated the following September. He served in an infantry regiment until October 1917. From September 1917 to March 1918, Krukoff attended the Imperial University of Kazan. In 1918, Krukoff served in the White Army, fighting the Bolsheviks. In 1919, he joined the Navy in Omsk, Siberia. In 1920, he joined the Marine Corps, serving until March 1920, under the command of Alexander Kolchak.

According to his own curriculum vitae, from March 1920 to June 1921, Krukoff worked for a lumber company in Manchuria. In 1970, he denied having worked in forestry in China or Japan. In June 1920, Krukoff was mobilized by the Russian White Government. In 1922, he left Vladivostok with the Siberian Flotilla.

In 1923, the flotilla was interned in the Philippines. Krukoff claimed, and later denied, to have worked on a rubber plantation near the Philippine city of Olongapo.

=== United States ===
According to Krukoff, he and other members of the flotilla were taken to San Francisco by US Navy transport. Krukoff reached the United States on March 29, 1925. He attended the State College of Forestry, in Syracuse, New York, from 1925 until his graduation in 1928.

In 1942, Krukoff purchased a house in Smithtown, New York. He lived in Smithtown for the remainder of his life, and joined the local volunteer fire department. Krukoff married his first wife, Florence V. Barry, in 1945. She assisted his work on Rauvolfia. Florence Barry died in 1974. In 1975, Krukoff married Ruth Hodgins. Krukoff had no children.

Krukoff was married to Ruth Hodgins for the remainder of his life. On January 19, 1983, he died from congestive heart failure in Smithtown's General Hospital. A memorial service was held at the New York Botanical Garden. Krukoff's files were donated to the Hoover Institution, the Smithsonian Institution, the New York Botanical Garden, and the Missouri Botanical Garden.

== Career ==
Krukoff was a consulting forester and economic botanist. His career focused on spermatophytes, gum-yielding trees, and medicinal plants. He also researched Strychnos and Erythrina.

=== 1928–1933: Expeditions ===
Between 1929 and 1955, Krukoff made expeditions to Africa, Sumatra, and the Amazon basin. Krukoff made eight major expeditions to Africa and South America, visiting, among other countries, Ghana, Cameroon, Argentina, Suriname, and Bolivia.

In 1928, Krukoff began working with the Intercontinental Rubber Company. This led to his first expedition to Brazil. From 1929 to 1931, Krukoff worked on the cultivation of Parthenium argentatum, a source of rubber. Krukoff's first plant collections were made between 1930 and 1931, in Africa and Sumatra.

Krukoff conducted an expedition to the Amazon basin between August 1931 and May 1932. On this trip, he collected plants for the New York Botanical Garden, and investigated plants used by indigenous people for the G. W. Cole Company. Whilst in Brazil, Krukoff also conducted industrial espionage against the Ford Motor Company, and wrote reports on their plantations, on behalf of the United States Rubber Company.

From August 1932 to January 1933, Krukoff conducted an expedition to Sumatra. This was apparently in order to take specimens to American rubber plantations. During this expedition, Krukoff and two other people formed a syndicate, which planned to obtain and sell Amorphophallus titanum bulbs.

=== 1935–1939: Caffco Drugs and Merck & Co. ===
In 1935, Krukoff co-founded the company Caffco Drugs. The company promoted a plant known as "C.K.C" (possibly Dulacia ovata, a synonym of Olax inopiflora). Krukoff was the company's vice president and production manager. He shipped samples from Manaus, Brazil, to New York, and set up chemical testing equipment in Manaus.

In 1935, whilst working for Merck & Co., Krukoff became interested in curare, a poison used in arrows. Krukoff worked with Karl Folkers and Albert Charles Smith on curare. He was interested in its potential financial benefits, suggesting that Caffco Drugs might supply curare producing plants. He also discussed the possibility of inserting curare into bullets.

In 1939, Krukoff was sent to Bolivia by Merck & Co., to collect seeds from Cinchona calisaya. The seeds, which were to be used for quinine production, were smuggled out of Bolivia illegally.

=== 1941–1979: Plantations and endowments ===
From 1941 to 1948, Krukoff worked for the American Chicle Company as a consultant botanist. His work for the company concerned potential chewing gums, and the genus Cnidoscolus.

In 1939, Krukoff visited Naranjo, Guatemala, where Merck & Co. had a Cinchona plantation. In 1942, Krukoff was appointed as Technical Vice President and Director of Research of Experimental Plantations, a subsidiary of Merck & Co. In 1960, Krukoff and his wife purchased Experimental Plantations from Merck & Co. They renamed the company to Ensayos Agricolas, and managed its planations for twelve years.

Later in life, Krukoff worked on taxonomy, and endowed research facilities. Starting in 1966, Krukoff supported research at the New York Botanical Garden, where he was an honorary curator. He also endowed facilities at the Missouri Botanical Garden, Royal Botanic Gardens, Kew, and the Hortus Botanicus Leiden. Krukoff supported the Flora Malesiana project.

Krukoff's endowments supported Hermann Otto Sleumer, Peter Goldblatt, and André Joseph Guillaume Henri Kostermans, among others. The New York Botanical Garden's B. A. Krukoff Curatorship supported Ghillean Prance, who remembered Krukoff fondly, and noted his contributions to systematics.

In 1979, Krukoff convened a world conference on the systematics of Leguminosae at Kew's Royal Botanic Gardens.

== Awards ==
In 1970, Krukoff received a Distinguished Service Award from the New York Botanical Garden.

On June 4, 1981, Krukoff was granted an honorary degree of science from the City University of New York.

Krukoff was the 1981 recipient of the Missouri Botanical Garden's Henry Shaw Medal.

== Legacy ==
Krukoff is the authority for 183 taxonomic names. He described twenty-five species of Strychnos, four genera and eleven species of Menispermaceae, and twenty-eight species of Erythrina.

Albert Charles Smith named the genus Krukoviella after Krukoff. Rupert Charles Barneby named the genus Borismene after Krukoff.

== See also ==
Category:Taxa named by Boris Alexander Krukoff
