= Rupert Charles Barneby =

British-born American botanist

- Born: October 6, 1911; Monmouthshire, Wales
- Died: December 5, 2000 (aged 89); Bronx, New York, United States
- Scientific career
- Fields: Botany
- Author abbrev. (botany): Barneby

Rupert Charles Barneby (6 October 1911 – 5 December 2000) was a British-born self-taught botanist whose primary specialty was the Fabaceae (Leguminosae), the pea family, but he also worked on Menispermaceae and numerous other groups. He was employed by the New York Botanical Garden from the 1950s until shortly before his death.

Barneby published prolifically and named and described over 1,100 new species. In addition, he had 25 species named after him as well as four genera: Barnebya, Barnebyella, Barnebydendron, and Rupertia. He received numerous prestigious botanical awards, including The New York Botanical Garden's Henry Allan Gleason Award (1980), the American Society of Plant Taxonomists' Asa Gray Award (1989), the International Association for Plant Taxonomy's Engler Silver Medal (1992), and the International Botanical Congress's Millennium Botany Award (1999).

His lifelong partner was Harry Dwight Dillon Ripley (1908–1973), with whom he collected botanical specimens across the western United States – particularly from the Fabaceae.

== Publications ==
- Barneby, Rupert (1964). "Atlas of North American Astragalus". The Memoirs of the New York Botanical Garden. v.13 (pt.1).
- Barneby, Rupert (1964). "Atlas of North American Astragalus". The Memoirs of the New York Botanical Garden. 13) (pt.2).
- Barneby, Rupert (1977). "Daleae imagines". The Memoirs of the New York Botanical Garden. 27).
- Barneby, Rupert; Irwin, Howard S. (1978). "Monographic studies in Cassia (Leguminosae, Caesalpinioideae)".
- Barneby, Rupert; Irwin, Howard S. (1982). "The American Cassiinae". The Memoirs of the New York Botanical Garden. v.35 (pt.1).
- Barneby, Rupert; Irwin, Howard S. (1982). "The American Cassiinae". The Memoirs of the New York Botanical Garden. v.35 (pt.2).
- Barneby, Rupert (1991). "Sensitivae censitae: description of the genus Mimosa Linnaeus (Mimosaceae) in the New World". The Memoirs of the New York Botanical Garden. v.65.
- Barneby, Rupert; Grimes, James W. (1996). "Silk tree, guanacaste, monkey's earring : a generic system for the synandrous Mimosaceae of the Americas". The Memoirs of the New York Botanical Garden. v.74 (pt.1).
- Barneby, Rupert; Grimes, James W. (1997). "Silk tree, guanacaste, monkey's earring : a generic system for the synandrous Mimosaceae of the Americas". The Memoirs of the New York Botanical Garden. v.74 (pt.2).
- Barneby, Rupert; Grimes, James W. (1998). "Silk tree, guanacaste, monkey's earring : a generic system for the synandrous Mimosaceae of the Americas". The Memoirs of the New York Botanical Garden. v.74 (pt.3).

== See also ==
- Category:Taxa named by Rupert Charles Barneby
