= Jascha =

Jascha and Yascha are Yiddish or German language spellings of the East Slavic name Yasha, a diminutive of Yakov, or Jacob. Notable people with the name include:

- Jascha Brodsky (1907–1997), Russian-American violinist
- Jascha Franklin-Hodge (born 1979), American businessman
- Jascha Gopinko (1891–1980), Ukrainian-Australian violinist
- Jascha Heifetz, (1901–1987), Russian-American violinist
- Jascha Horenstein (1898–1973), American conductor
- Jascha Lieberman, Polish violinist
- Jascha Richter (born 1963), Danish-American singer and songwriter
- Jascha Silberstein (1934—2008), German-born American musician
- Jascha Spivakovsky (1896–1970), Russian-born Australian pianist
- Jascha Washington (born 1989), American actor
- Jascha Zayde (1911–1999), American pianist, composer and conductor
- Yascha Mounk (born 1982), German-American political scientist

== See also ==
- Yasha
- Joscha
