= Yaca =

Yaca may refer to:

- yaca, the concept of a namesake in Fijian tradition
- yacA, a gene

== See also ==
- Yacas, a computer algebra system
- Yacca (disambiguation)
- Yacka (disambiguation)
- Yaka (disambiguation)
- IACA (disambiguation)
