= Yaka =

Yaka may refer to:

== Places in Turkey ==
- Yaka, Başmakçı
- Yaka, Bozdoğan
- Yaka, Düzce
- Yaka, Gelendost, a village in Gelendost District, Isparta Province
- Yaka, Kastamonu
- Yaka, Kemaliye
- Yaka, Tavas
- Yaka, Yapraklı
- Yaka Castle or Güdübeş Castle, a castle ruin in Mersin Province,
- ,Yaka Canyon, a canyon in Isparta Province Turkey

== Other uses ==
- Yaka Bāgh or Yekkeh Bagh, Torbat-e Jam, a village in Razavi Khorasan Province, Iran
- Yaka, Central African Republic, near Mbokassa
- Yaka, Togo
- Yaka language (disambiguation)
- Yaka people, an African ethnic group
- Yaka Station, a train station in Himeji, Hyōgo Prefecture, Japan

== See also ==
- Yaca (disambiguation)
- Yakan (disambiguation)
- Yakka (disambiguation)
