= Yaksha (disambiguation) =

Yaksha is a name of several nature-spirits in Hindu and Buddhist mythology.

Yaksha may also refer to:

- Yaksha kingdom, territory of a mythical tribe in ancient India and ancient Sri Lanka
- Yaksha (rural locality), several rural localities in Russia
- Yaksha: Ruthless Operations, a 2022 South Korean film
- Yaksha, a genus with one species, Yaksha perettii, an extinct amphibian

== See also ==
- Jakh Botera or Bohter Yaksha, a group of folk deities worshiped in Kutch district of Gujarat, India
- Yaksha Prashna, a story from the Mahabharata
- Yakshagana, a traditional theatre form
- Yaksa (band), a Chinese metalcore band
- Yatchan or Yaksha, a 2015 Indian film
- Yakshini, female counterpart of the nature spirits
- Yakka (disambiguation)
- Yakkha (disambiguation)
- Yasha (disambiguation)
