= TILS =

TILS may refer to:

- Tumor-infiltrating lymphocytes
- TRNAIle-lysidine synthase, an enzyme
