= Yacca =

Yacca may refer to:

- Trees of the species Podocarpus purdieanus and Podocarpus coriaceus, found in the West Indies
- Plants of the Xanthorrhoea genus, found in Australia

== See also ==
- Yucca, several plant species
- Yaca (disambiguation)
- Yacka (disambiguation)
