= IACA =

IACA may refer to:

- Indian Arts and Crafts Act of 1990
- International Anti-Corruption Academy
- International Association of Consulting Actuaries
- International Association of Crime Analysts
