= Limassol Castle =

Medieval castle in Limassol, Cyprus

- Κάστρο Λεμεσού (Greek); Limasol Kalesi (Turkish)
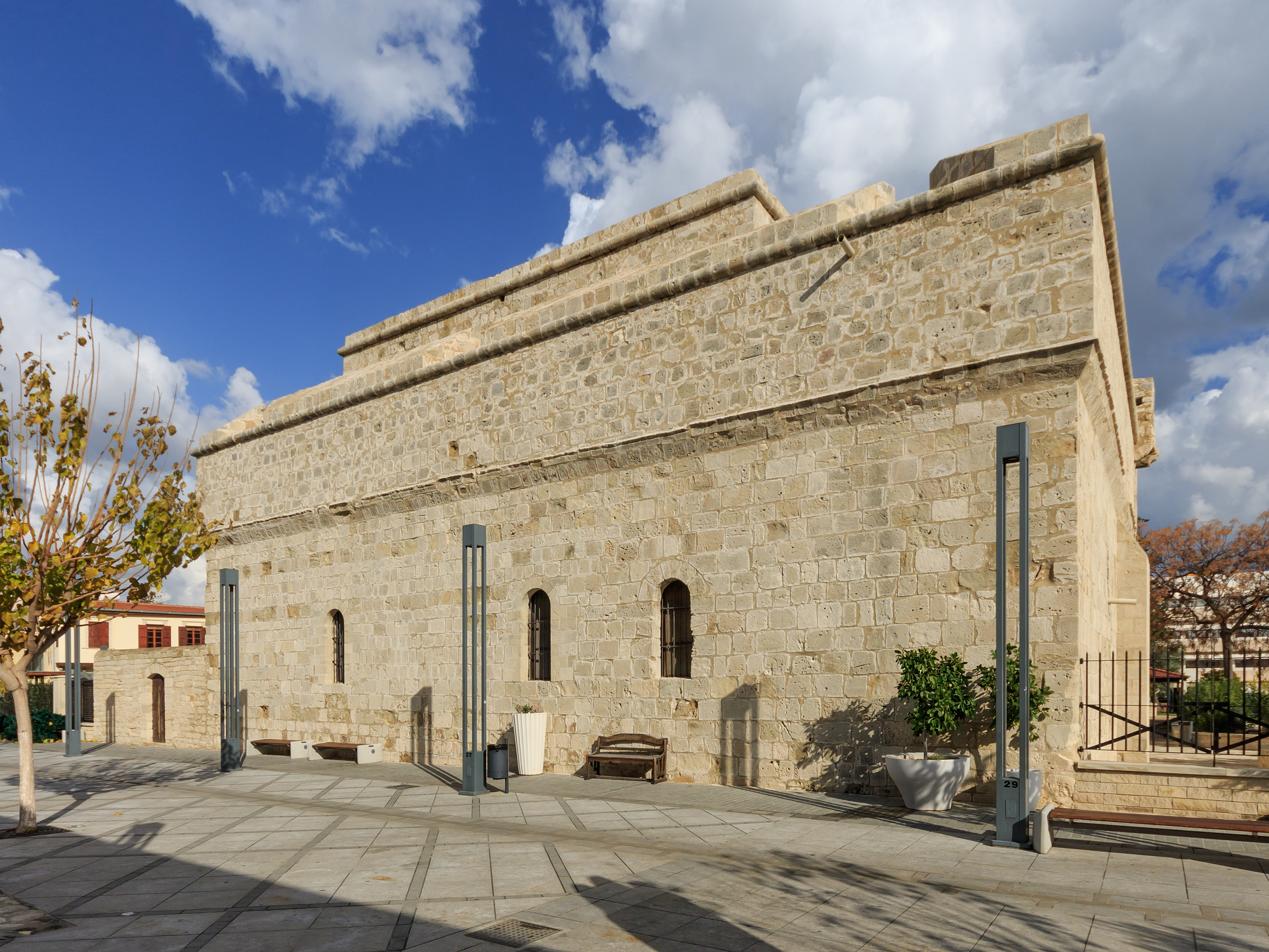
- Limassol Castle

- Location within Cyprus

General information
- Architectural style: Medieval
- Location: Limassol, Cyprus
- Coordinates: 34.6722°N 33.0415°E

Limassol Castle (Greek: Κάστρο Λεμεσού, Turkish: Limasol Kalesi) is situated near the old harbour in the heart of the historical centre of the city of Limassol. The castle as it appears today is a structure rebuilt c. 1590 under the period of Ottoman rule.

== Overview ==
Archaeological investigation within the castle revealed that it was built over an Early Christian basilica (4–7th centuries) and a Middle Byzantine monument (10th–11th centuries). Other finds beneath the castle show the existence of an important church, possibly the city's first cathedral.

According to Etienne Lusignan, the original castle was erected by Guy of Lusignan in 1193. The first official reference to the fort dates to 1228, during the involvement of Holy Roman Emperor Frederick II in the affairs of Cyprus. From its erection until the beginning of the 16th century, damages were caused by the continuous attacks of the town by the Genoese and the Mamluks as well as by earthquakes alternating with restorations and reconstructions.

In 1538 the Ottomans captured Limassol and the castle. The Venetian governor of Cyprus, after recapturing the castle, decided to demolish it in order to avoid its possible seizure. This destruction was completed in 1567–1568. After the Ottoman acquisition of Cyprus in 1576, the remains or parts of the castle were incorporated in the new Ottoman fort, completed in 1590, which was considerably strengthened. The underground chamber and the first floor were transformed into prison cells and remained in use until 1950.

According to tradition, this is where Richard the Lionheart married Berengaria of Navarre and crowned her Queen of England in 1191.

== In popular culture ==
Limassol Castle appears in the video game Assassin's Creed: Bloodlines.

== Gallery ==
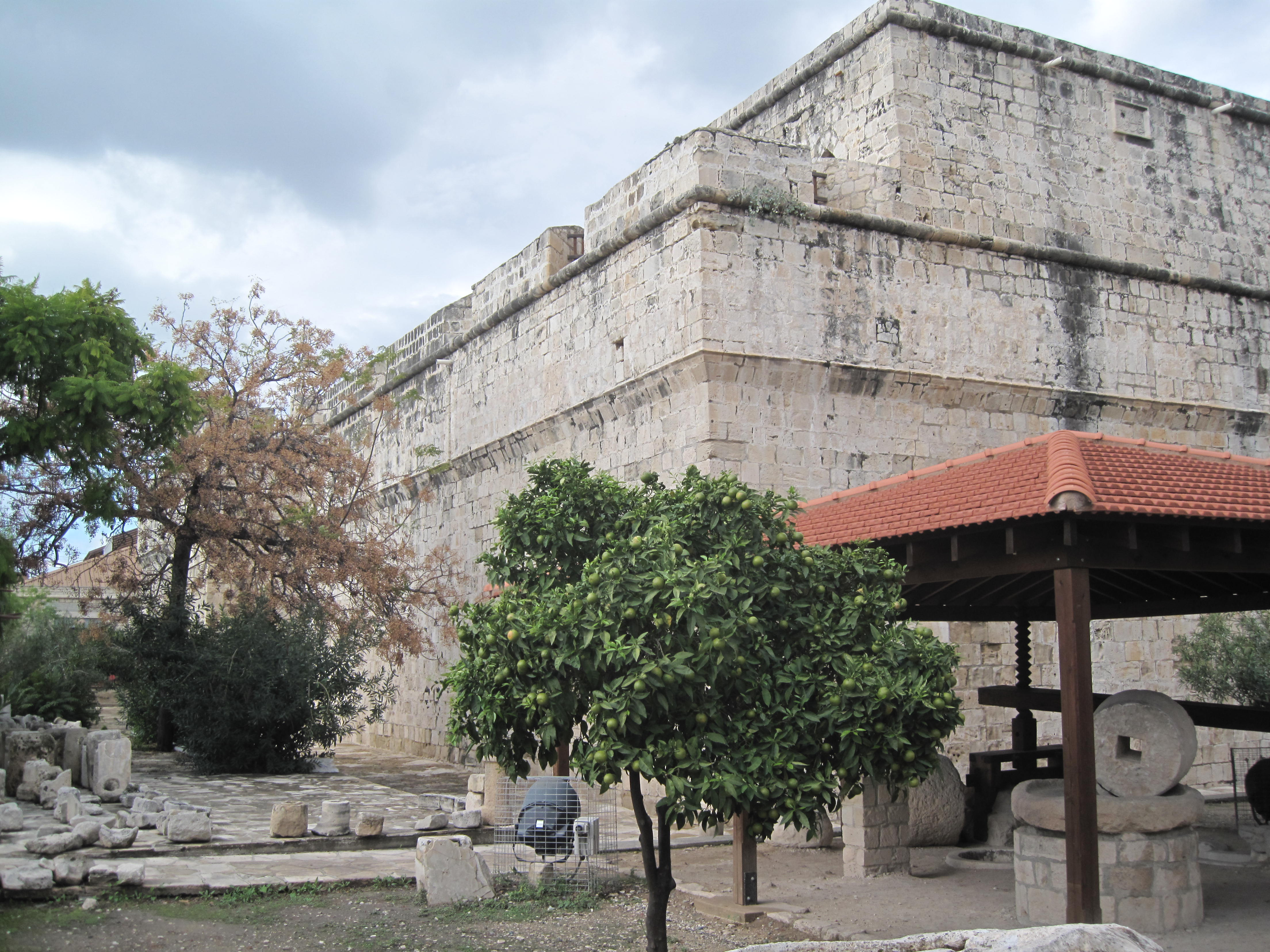
East facade

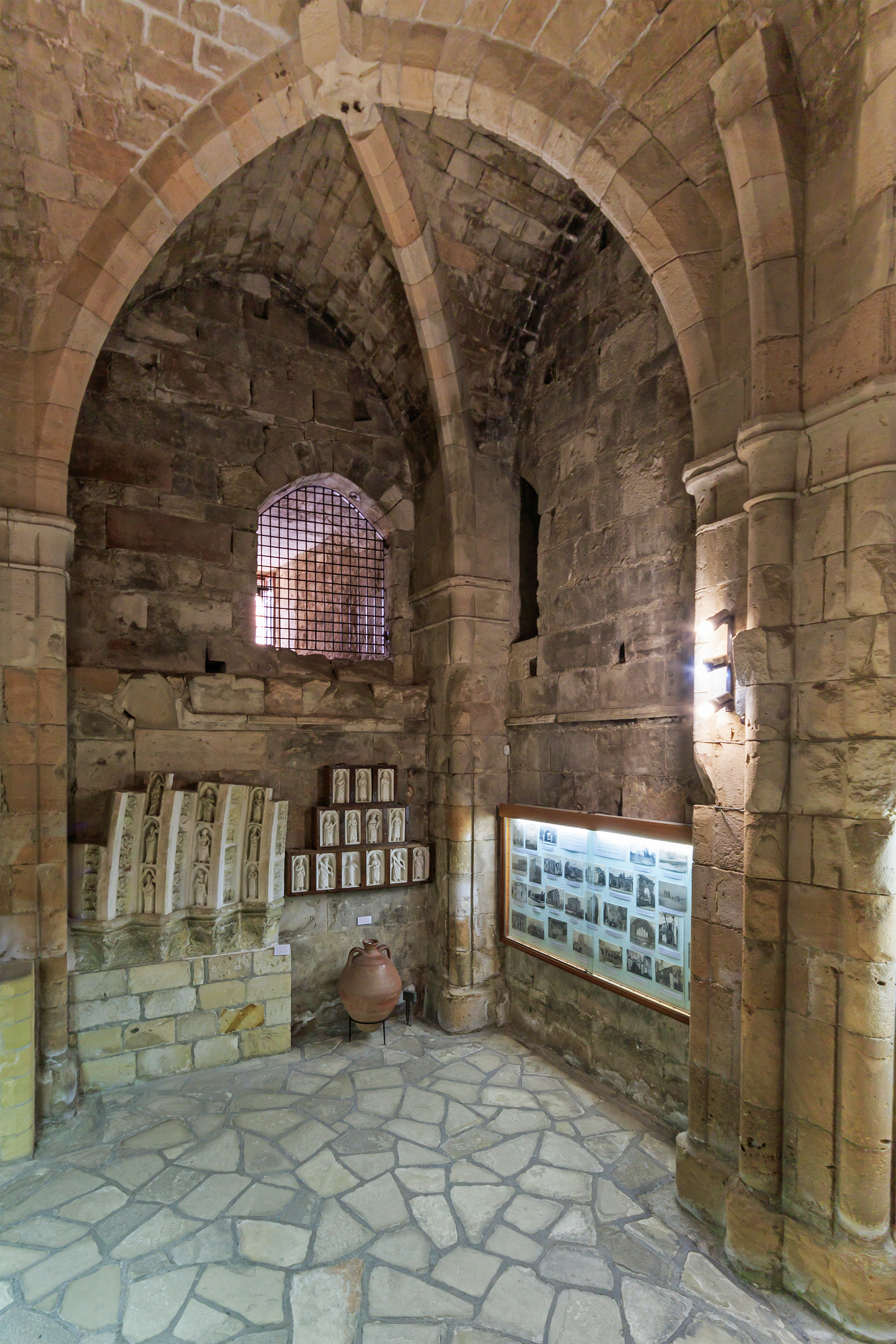
Interior

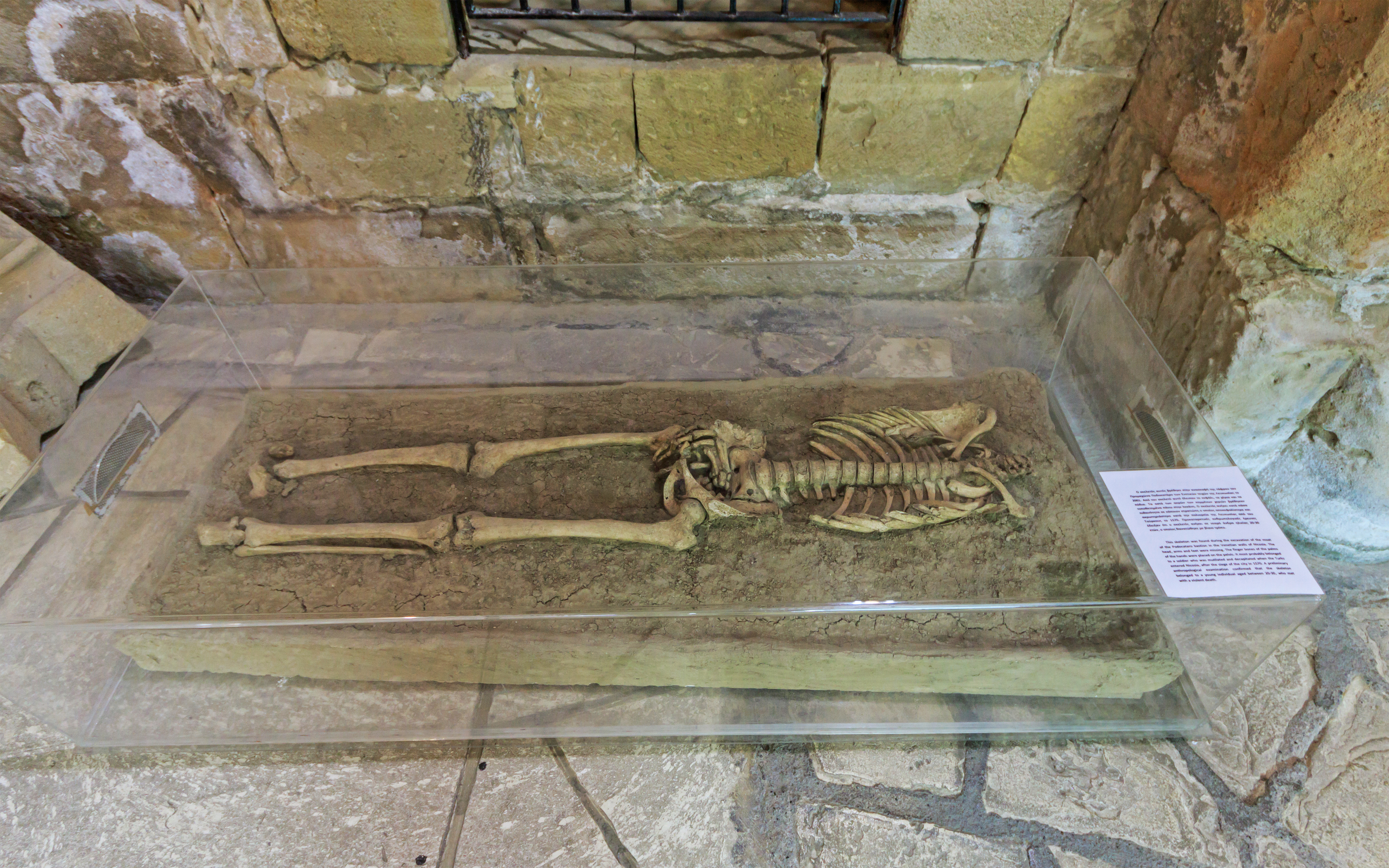
Interior

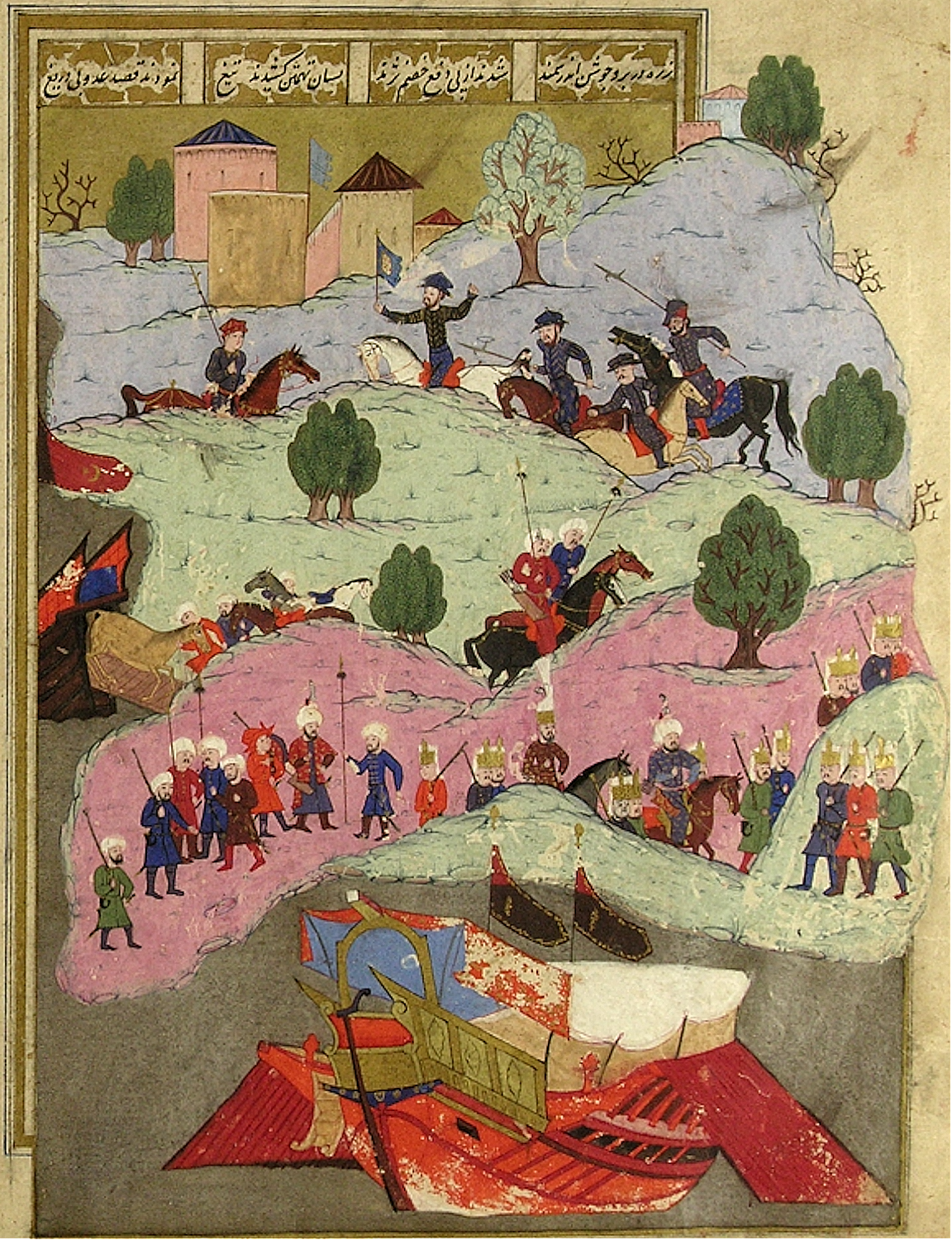
A miniature painting depicting the landing of Ottoman soldiers in Limassol Castle during the Ottoman conquest of Cyprus in 1570–1571

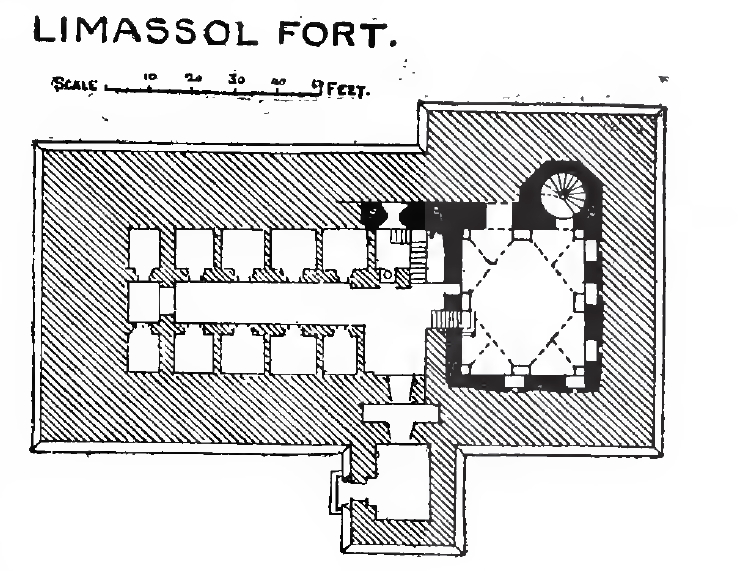
Ground plan 1918

== See also ==
- List of Crusader castles
