= Adimeh =

Adimeh العديمة
- Village
- Location in Syria
- Coordinates: 35°9′4″N 35°55′45″E
- Country: Syria
- Governorate: Tartus
- District: Baniyas District
- Subdistrict: Baniyas

Population (2004)
  - Total: 1,408
- Time zone: UTC+2 (EET)
  - Summer (DST): UTC+3 (EEST)
- City Qrya Pcode: C5362

Adimeh or al-'Adimah (Arabic: العديمة) is a village in northwestern Syria administratively part of the Baniyas District of Tartus Governorate. According to the Syria Central Bureau of Statistics (CBS), Adimeh had a population of 1,408 in the 2004 census. Its inhabitants are predominantly Sunni Muslims.

Some of its resident's were displaced during the Syrian Civil War, and since the conflict's conclusion in December 2024 at least 146 people have returned to their homes. This figure only includes IDPs and not refugees.

Near Adimeh, there is a Crusader castle called Burj al-Sabi.

== Sources ==
- Balanche, Fabrice (2000). "Les Alaouites, l'espace et le pouvoir dans la région côtière syrienne : une intégration nationale ambiguë" (in French). Tours: Université François Rabelais.
