= Podocarpus purdieanus =

Conservation status
- Endangered (IUCN 3.1)

Scientific classification
- Kingdom: Plantae
- Clade: Tracheophytes
- Clade: Gymnosperms
- Division: Pinophyta
- Class: Pinopsida
- Order: Araucariales
- Family: Podocarpaceae
- Genus: Podocarpus
- Species: P. purdieanus

Binomial name
- Podocarpus purdieanus Hook.

Synonyms
- Nageia purdieana (Hook.) F.Muell.; Podocarpus jamaicensis J.Nelson; Podocarpus mucronatus Carrière, not validly publ.

Species of conifer

Podocarpus purdieanus , the yacca or St. Ann yacca, is a species of conifer in the family Podocarpaceae. It is endemic to Jamaica.

It grows in dense moist forest on limestone from 350 to 870 metres elevation. It can be found amongst species such as Terminalia latifolia, Cedrela odorata, Calophyllum brasiliense var. antillanum, and Jupunba alexandri. This tree makes valuable lumber, so it has been overharvested, resulting in its current fragmented population that is limited to central Jamaica.

The wood from this tree was especially good for building ship masts and the smaller trees are still used to make yam sticks. Other threats include mining, particularly of bauxite, and clearing of forest habitat for plantations and settlements.
