= Yakka =

Yakka is a term with multiple meanings in Australian and New Zealand English, referring both to slang for hard work and to a natural sticky resin derived from certain native Australian plants.

1. Etymology and Slang Usage

In Australian and New Zealand slang, yakka(often used in the phrase hard yakka) means hard work or strenuous labor. The word originates from the Yagara Aboriginal language of Queensland, where yaga means work. It became widely adopted into Australian English and is commonly used across informal contexts. The popularity of the term has led to its use in commercial branding, most notably by the Australian workwear company Hard Yakka, which emphasizes the toughness and durability associated with the expression.

Example usage:

“Building the fence was real hard yakka.”

2. Botanical Usage: Yakka Resin The word yakka (or yacca) also refers to the resin or gum produced by Australian native plants of the genus Xanthorrhoea, commonly known as grass trees. In South Australia, these plants are colloquially called yacca, a term unrelated to the Yagara-origin slang.

The sticky resin secreted by the grass trees has traditionally been used by Aboriginal Australians as an adhesive, particularly for attaching spearheads or tools. The resin is notable for being highly flammable and was historically used as a fire-starting material as well.

Yakka or yacka may refer to:

- Yacka, South Australia, a settlement in South Australia
- Yakka, common name for the grasstree Xanthorrhoea in South Australia
- Yakka people (Lanka), a historic/mythical group of Sri Lanka
- Yakka, a type of spirits worshipped by the Vedda people of Sri Lanka
- Yakkha people, an ethnic group of Nepal and northern India
- Yakkha language, a Sino-Tibetan language
- Yakka Banovic (born 1956), Bosnian footballer

== See also ==
- Hard yakka, a term meaning "hard work" in Australian English and New Zealand English
- Yakka Labour, an Australian labour hire platform whose name derives from the term "hard yakka"
- A Lot of Hard Yakka, autobiography by English cricketer journalist Simon Hughes
- Yaca (disambiguation)
- Yacca (disambiguation)
- Yacker, a creature in the video game Sonic Colors
- Yaka (disambiguation)
- Yakkha (disambiguation)
- Yaksha (disambiguation)
