= List of Crusader castles =

Overview of fortified medieval residences in the Eastern Mediterranean

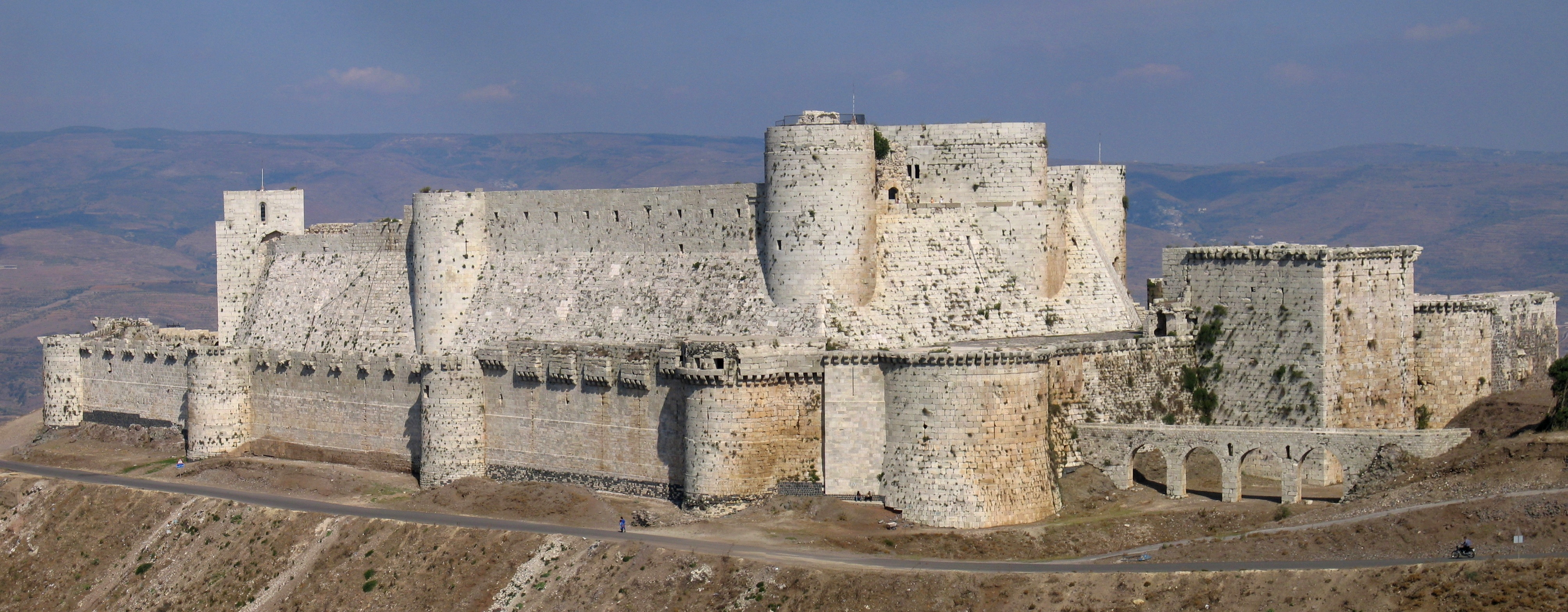
Krak des Chevaliers was built during the 12th and 13th centuries by the Knights Hospitaller with later additions by the Mamluks. It is a World Heritage Site.

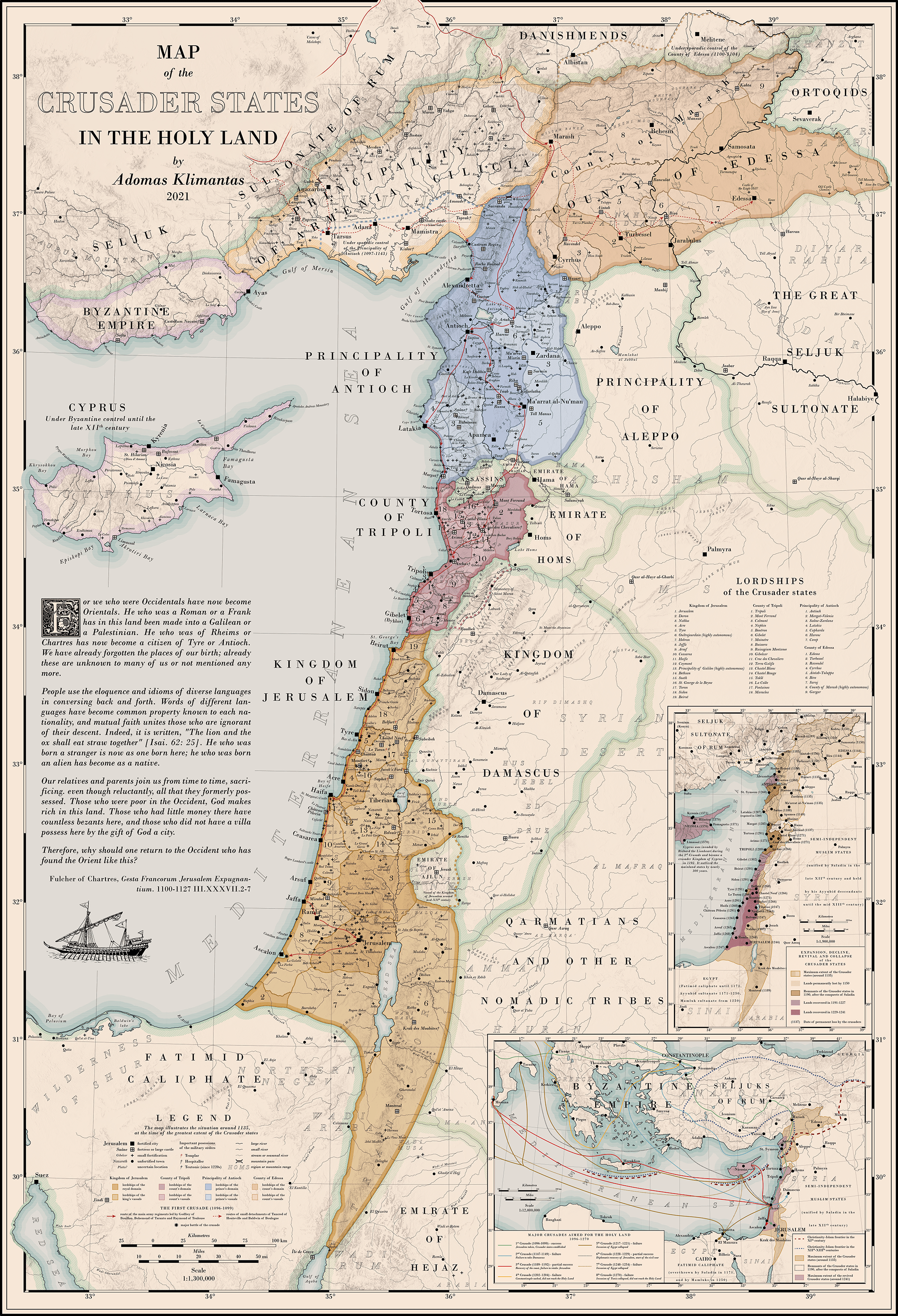
Detailed map of the Crusader states at the time of maximum territorial extent. The map shows more than 600 identified medieval Crusader, Armenian and Muslim fortified sites in the Holy Land.

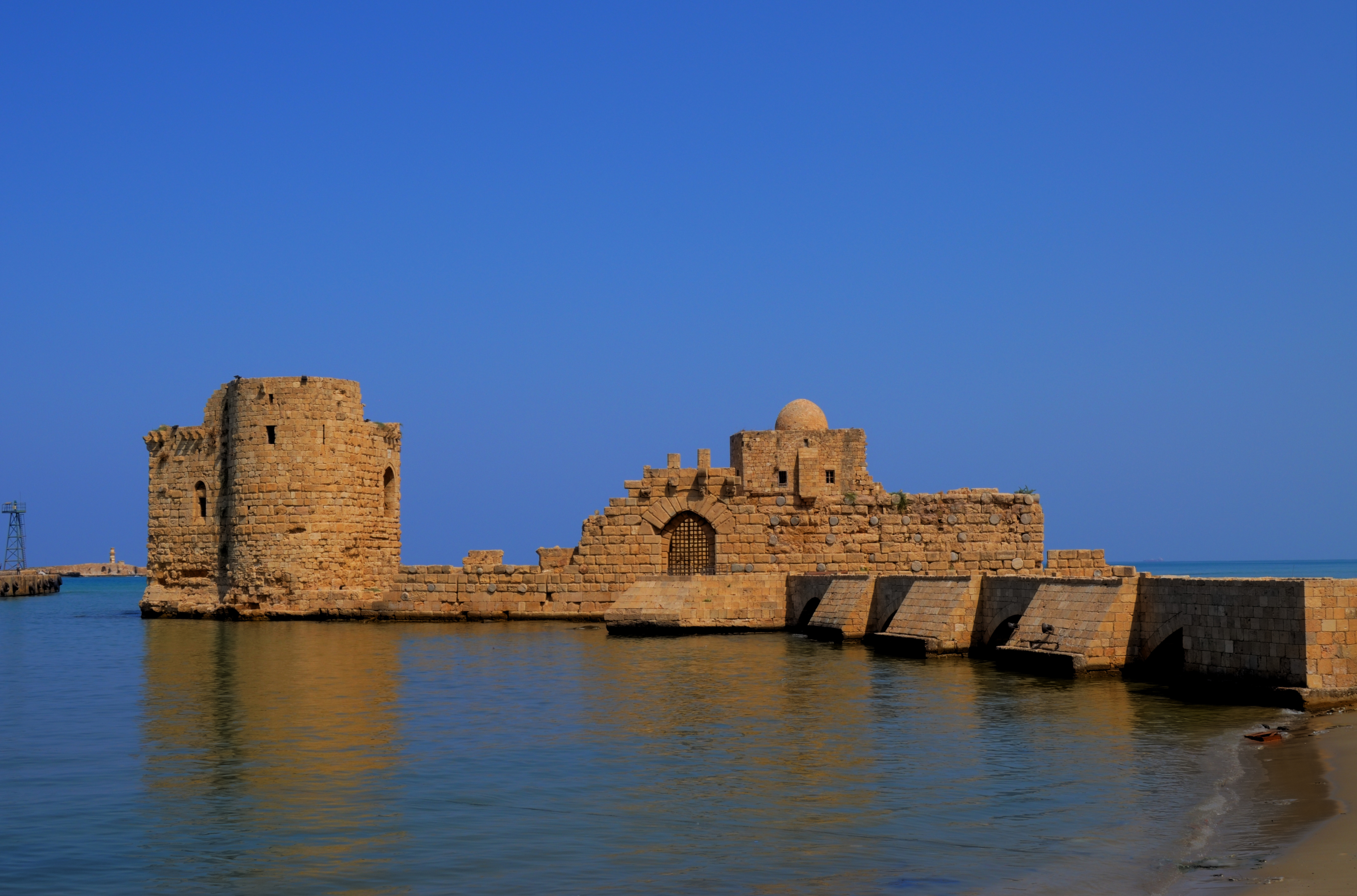
Sidon's Sea Castle built by the crusaders as a fortress of the Holy Land in Sidon, Lebanon.

This is a list of castles in the Eastern Mediterranean and the Middle East, founded or occupied during the Crusades. For crusader castles in Poland and the Baltic states, see Ordensburg.

There were two major phases of the deliberate destruction (slighting) of Crusader castles: in 1187 by Saladin and after 1260 by the Mamluks. The intention was often to prevent the castles from being reused by the Crusaders.

Of the architecture built by the Crusaders, castles have received more scholarly attention than other forms, such as ecclesiastical architecture.

== Crusader states ==
=== Geographic location on today's map ===
- Kingdom of Cyprus: Island of Cyprus (north and south)
- County of Edessa: south-east Turkey
- Principality of Antioch: north-west Syria, southern Turkey
- County of Tripoli: northern Lebanon, north-west Syria
- Kingdom of Jerusalem
  - Lordship of Sidon: central Lebanon
  - Principality of Galilee: northern Israel, southern Lebanon, southwest Syria
  - County of Jaffa and Ascalon: southern Israel, eastern Egypt
  - Lordship of Oultrejordain: south-west Jordan

== Crusader castles by modern states ==
=== Cyprus ===
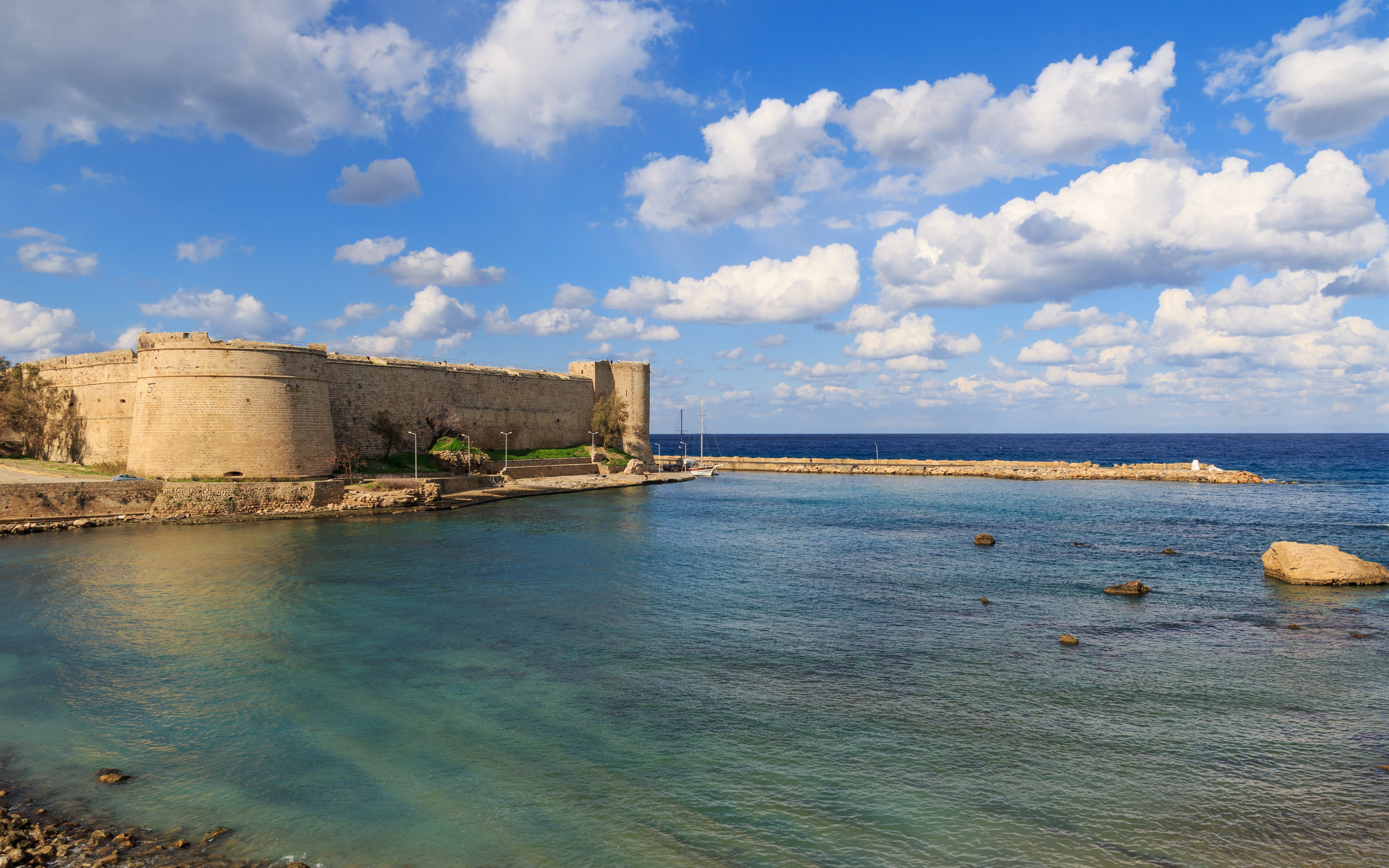
Kyrenia Castle

- Buffavento Castle
- Othello Castle
- Kantara Castle
- Kolossi Castle
- Kyrenia Castle
- Larnaca Castle
- Limassol Castle
- Paphos Castle
- St. Hilarion Castle

=== Egypt ===
- Castle of Saladin, Pharaoh's Island

=== Greece ===
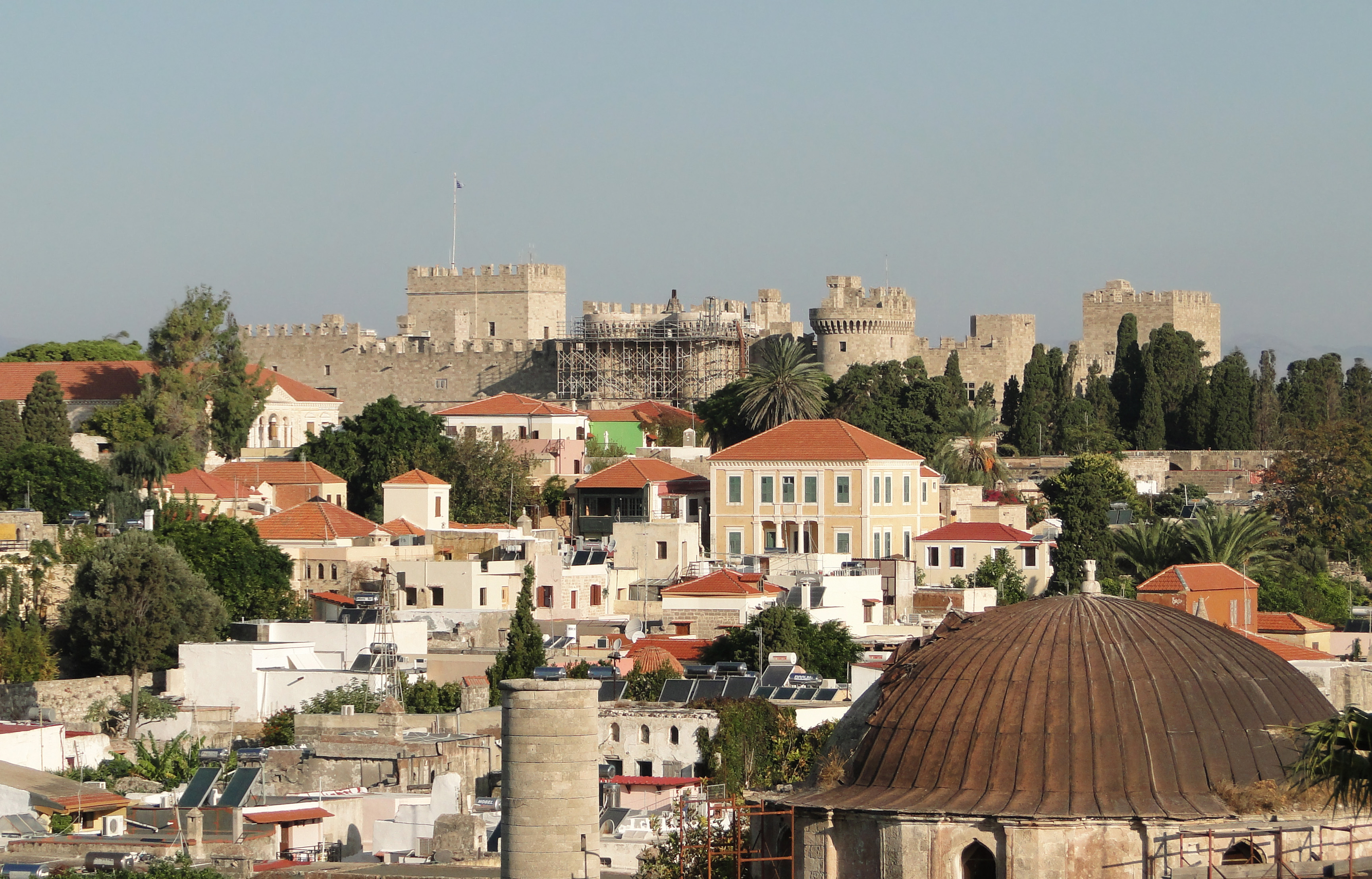
The Grandmasters Palace of the Knights on Rhodes island

- Amfissa Castle
- Corfu castles
- Halki Castle
- Kastellorizo Castle
- Kos Castle
- Leros island castle
- Platamon Castle
- Rhodes Island, Palace of the Grand Master of the Knights of Rhodes (Knights Hospitaller of St. John)

=== Israel, Palestine and the Golan Heights ===
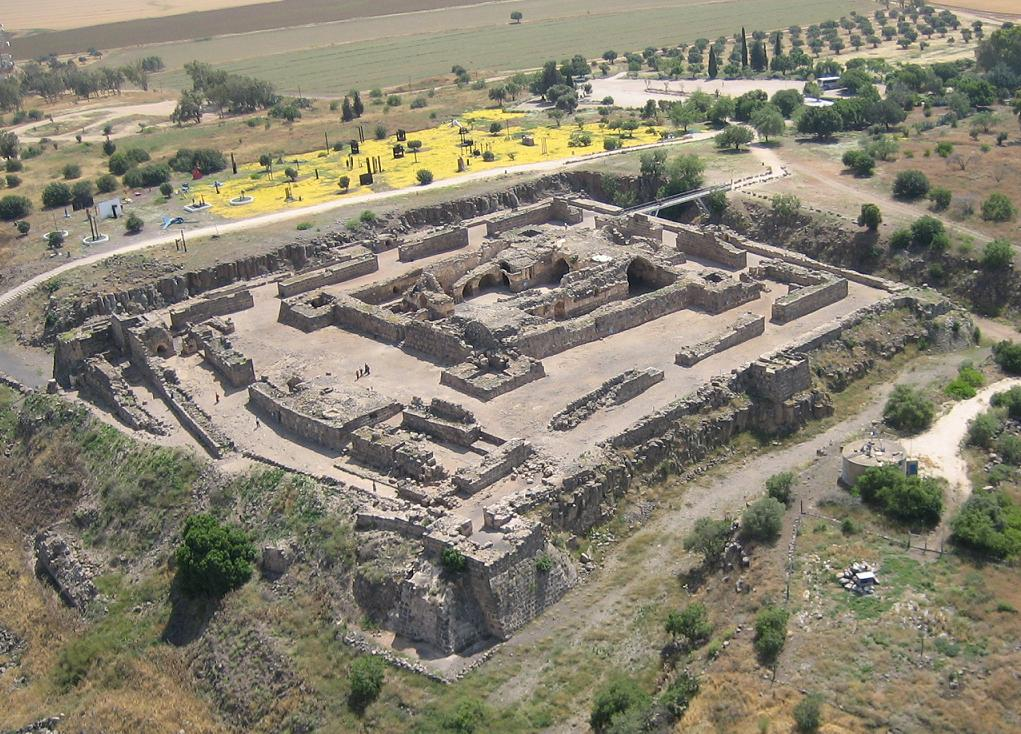
The remains of Belvoir Castle

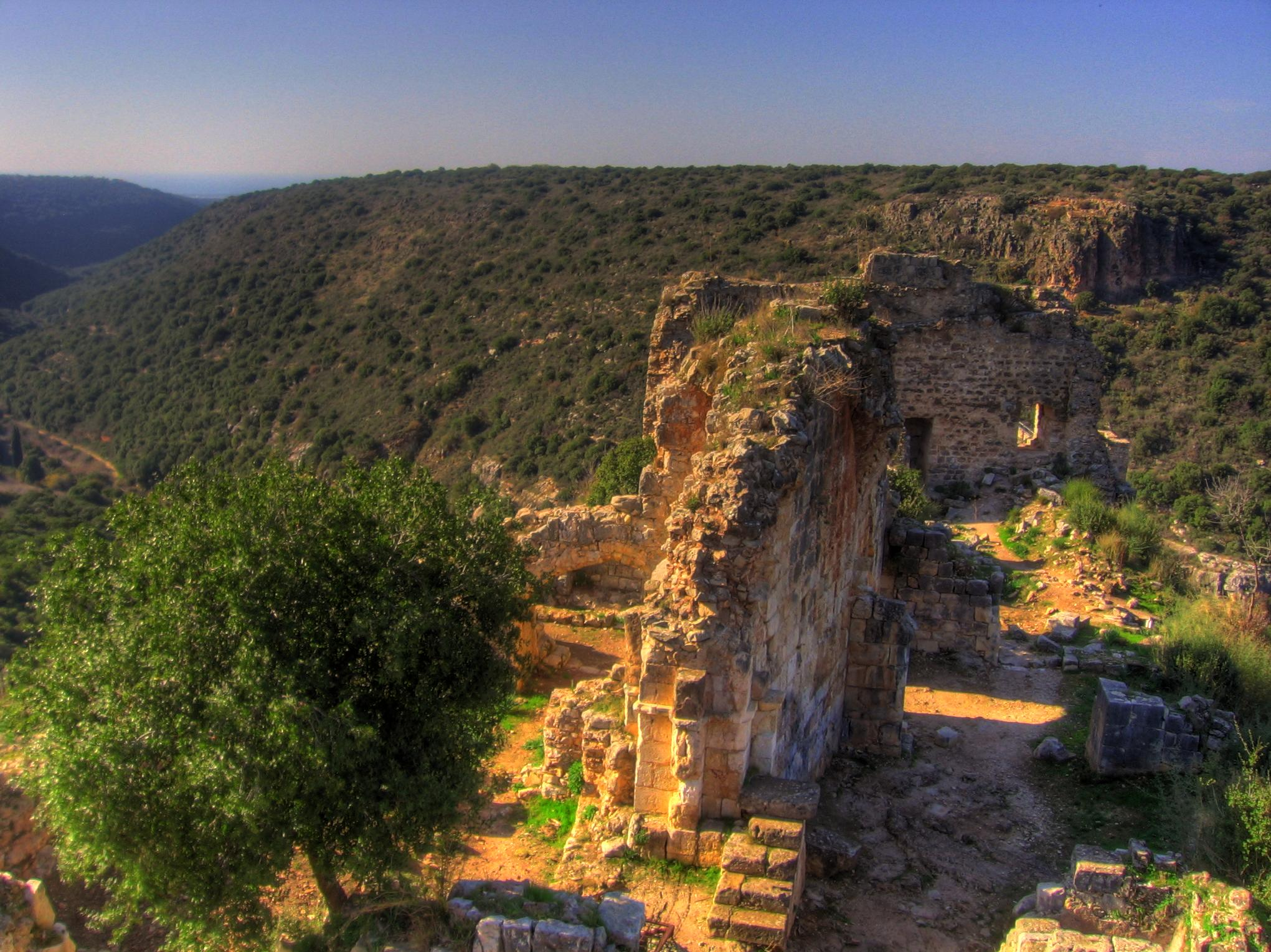
Monfort castle

West Bank and Golan Heights sites are marked as such.

- Acre (Akko) – fortified city
- Aqua Bella, now Ein Hemed – Crusader fortified farm; national park
- Arsuf, also known as Arsur or Apollonia – fortified city and citadel, stronghold of the Lordship of Arsuf; national park
- Ashkelon – fortified city
- Belinas or Caesarea Philippi (Banias) – fortified city, Golan Heights
- Belmont – ruins of Crusader castle in Kibbutz Tzova
- Belveer – Crusader castle of which no traces remain; national park
- Belvoir Castle; Kochav HaYarden National Park
- Bet Shean – castle ruins next to ancient town, stronghold of the Lordship of Bethsan. Second castle on the tell.
- Bethaatap, Arabic: Bayt 'Ittab (Beit Itab) – fortified manor (maison forte)
- Beth Gibelin at Eleutheropolis – castle ruins next to ancient town, stronghold of the Lordship of Beth Gibelin; national park
- Blanchegarde at Tell es-Safi – castle, seat of a lordship at biblical tell
- Caco or Cacho Castle, Qaqun; rebuilt by Baybars; national park
- Caesarea (Maritima), stronghold of the Lordship of Caesarea – fortified port city; national park
- Cafarlet (Hebrew: HaBonim, Arabic: Kafr Lam) – ruins of Umayyad fort reused by the Crusaders
- Calansue, Hospitaller castle
- Casal Imbert – at Achziv (formerly Az-Zeeb until 1948) – Crusader "new town" with tower; nothing discernible at present
- Casel des Plains – Azor; ruins of Crusader tower; inside town
- Castellum Beleismum – tower on biblical Tel Dothan, West Bank
- Castellum Beroart – the Minat al-Qal'a Umayyad fort reused by the Crusaders; at Ashdod
- Castellum Regis; castle, now inside village of Mi'ilya
- Castellum Rogerii Langobardi – castle at Umm Khalid/Netaniya
- Caymont at Tel Yokneam, seat of lordship
- Chastel Hernaut or Arnoul, Latin: Castellum Arnaldi – castle at Yalu
- Chastel Neuf or Castellum Novum outside Margaliot, castle, rebuilt in Ottoman time (Qal'at Hunin)
- Chastelet (Vadum Iacob), castle ruin by Jacob's Ford: see Battle of Jacob's Ford; also known as Vadum Iacob, le Chastelez, Ateret, Qasr al-'Atra
- Château Pèlerin, also known as Atlit Castle and Castle Pilgrim; off-reach military base
- Cisterna Rubea or Maldoim, Templar castle, West Bank
- Destroit, Le, near Atlit
- Forbelet Castle at Taibe, Galilee; battle site near the Hospitaller castle
- Ibelin, near Yavne
- Jaffa, fortified port town
- Judin Castle at Khirbat Jiddin or Yehiam Fortress – Crusader castle, rebuilt in the 18th century; national park
- Latrun, ruins of Toron des Chevaliers castle
- Kastel, on a hilltop next to Mevasseret, by the main Jerusalem-Tel Aviv road
- Merle - fortified enclosure, Arabic name: Burj al-Habis and Qal'at al-Tantura, at Dor/Tantura
- Mirabel, in Hebrew: Migdal Tsedek, stronghold of the Lordship of Mirabel
- Montfort; inside national park
- Qula, Hospitaller tower and vaulted structure
- Ramla, stronghold of the Lordship of Ramla
- Safed citadel, Crusader and Mamluk castle
- St Elias, Castle of (Castrum Sancti Helie), ruins at Taybeh, West Bank
- Saforie, le or Sepphoris (Latin), Saffuriya (Arabic): tower; national park
- Tel Hanaton – fortified farm, tower
- Tiberias – fortified Crusader city immediately north of abandoned city established in Roman times; on the shore of the Sea of Galilee
- Titura/Tittora at Modi'in, castle ruins
- Tour Rouge or Turris Rubea at Burgata, Sharon plain – Arabic: Burj al-Ahmar, Hebrew: Hurvat Burgata. The site of a later Muslim village built around the ruined keep.
- Turris Salinarum at Tel Taninim – Crusader tower, the only remains of the castle

==== Site not identified ====
- Gaza, a castle built by King Baldwin III in 1149–1150 "on a hill" was handed over to and held by the Templars

=== Jordan ===
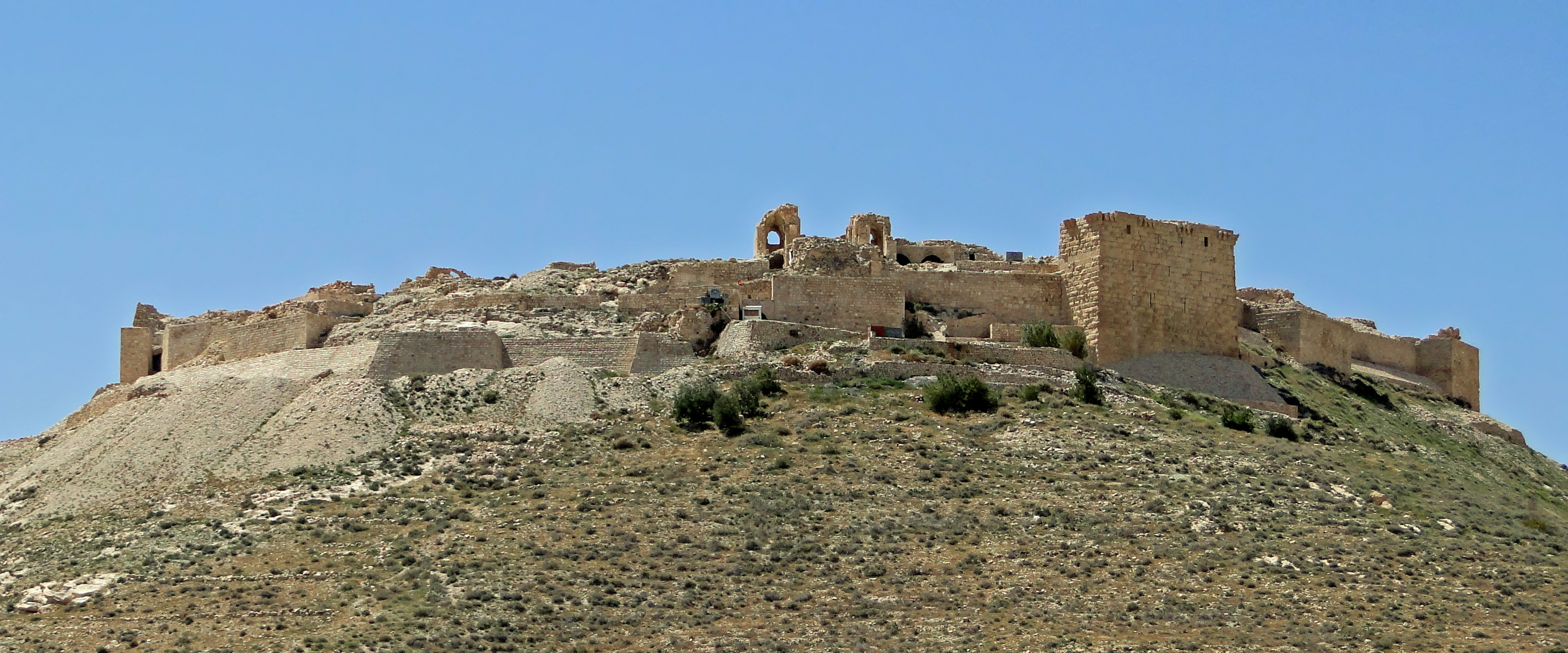
Montreal (Shaubak)

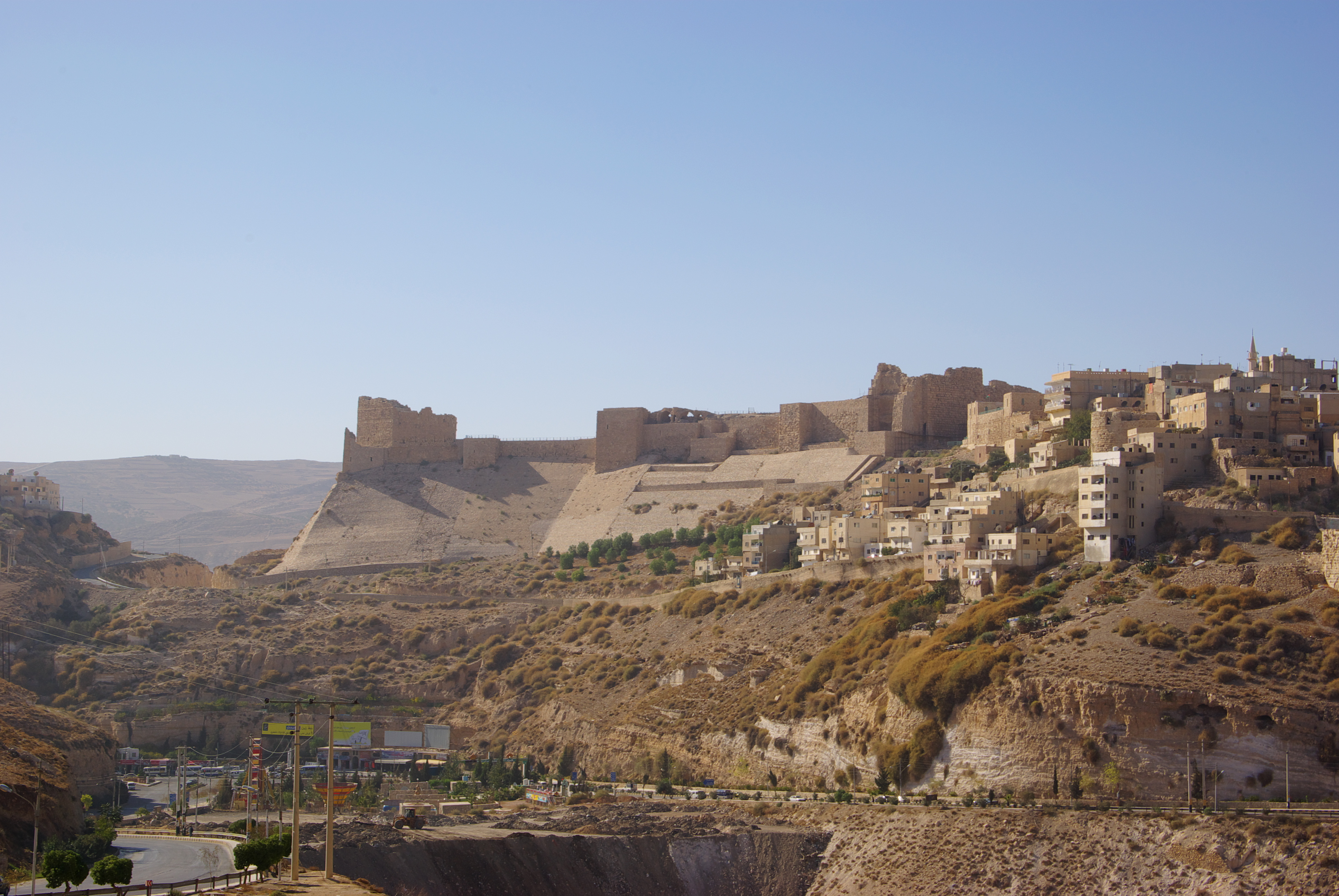
Kerak

- Kerak Castle
- Montreal
- Tafilah
- Vaux Moise (Wu'ayra in Arabic) near Petra

==== Doubtful proposals ====
- Aqaba – doubtful, no traces found; castle on Ile de Graye might have been meant instead
- Diban Castle 31°30′7″N 35°46′36″E
- Hisban Crusader Castle

==== Discarded proposals ====
- Jarash: the Temple of Artemis was reused as a castle by the Damascenes and destroyed by Baldwin II of Jerusalem, was therefore not used by the Crusaders.

=== Lebanon ===
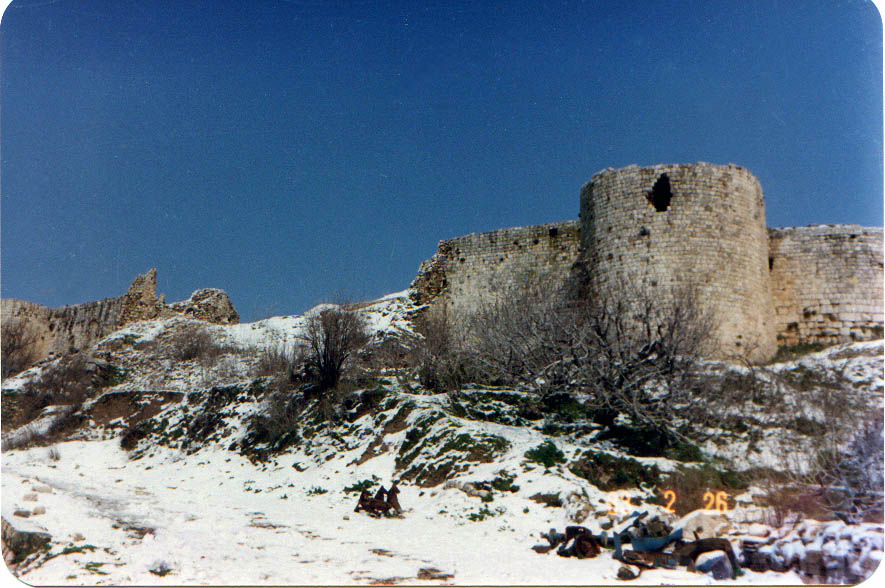
Crusader castle in the village of Toron, Lebanon

- Arqa
- Batroun
- Beaufort Castle
- Beirut Castle, demolished in the late 19th century
- Belhacem, 33°34′24″N 35°28′36″E
- Byblos Castle
- Citadel of Raymond de Saint-Gilles
- Doubiye Castle
- Gibelacar
- Coliath
- Deir Kifa Castle
- Hasbaya Castle
- Moinetre
- Mseilha Fort
- Nephin
- Saint Louis Castle – Sidon Land Castle
- Scandelion Castle
- Sidon Sea Castle, stronghold of the Lordship of Toron
- Toron, stronghold of the Lordship of Toron

=== Syria ===
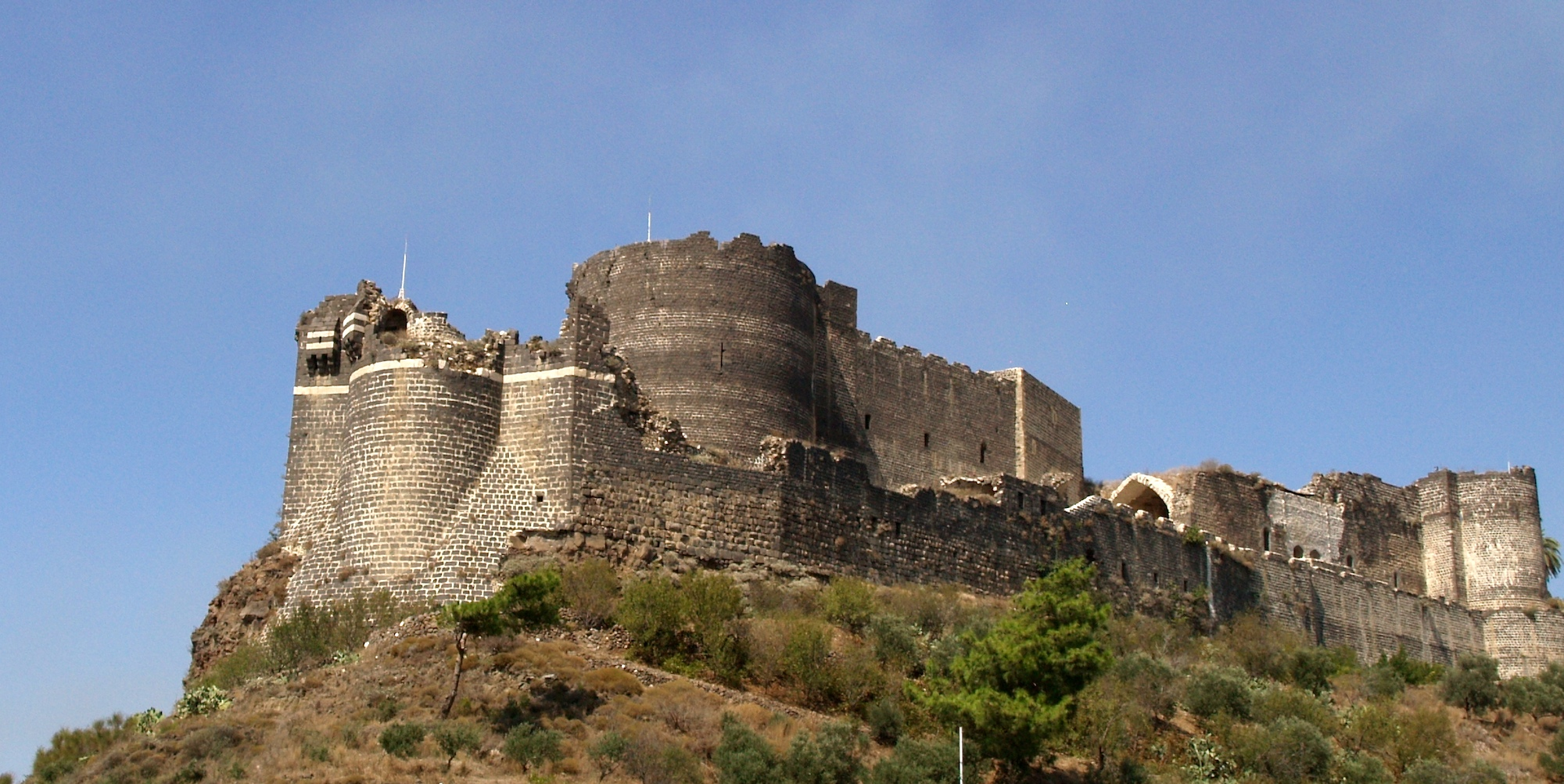
The remains of Margat

- Areimeh Castle, 34°44′40″N 36°02′33″E
- Baniyas
- Belinas – Banias; fortified town
- Bourzey castle
- Burj al-Sabi, near Adimeh, 35°09′14″N 35°55′39″E
- Chastel Blanc
- Chastel Rouge
- Citadel of Tartus and Cathedral of Our Lady of Tortosa
- Krak des Chevaliers
- Maraclea
- Margat, also known as Marqab
- Masyaf Castle
- Montferrand
- Nimrod Fortress, Arabic names Qal'at Nimrud and Qal'at as-Subayba; Ayyubid castle expanded by Baibars, built to protect the road to Damascus from Crusaders and Muslim rivals; however, a Crusader phase now seems again as proven, based on masonry and construction style of inner parts.
- Qadmous
- Rouad
- Saladdin Castle, Crusader name: Saône
- Sarmada
- Qalaat al-Shaghur

==== Discarded proposals ====
- Qasr Bardawil, wrongly identified for a while as the Castle of al-Al

=== Turkey ===
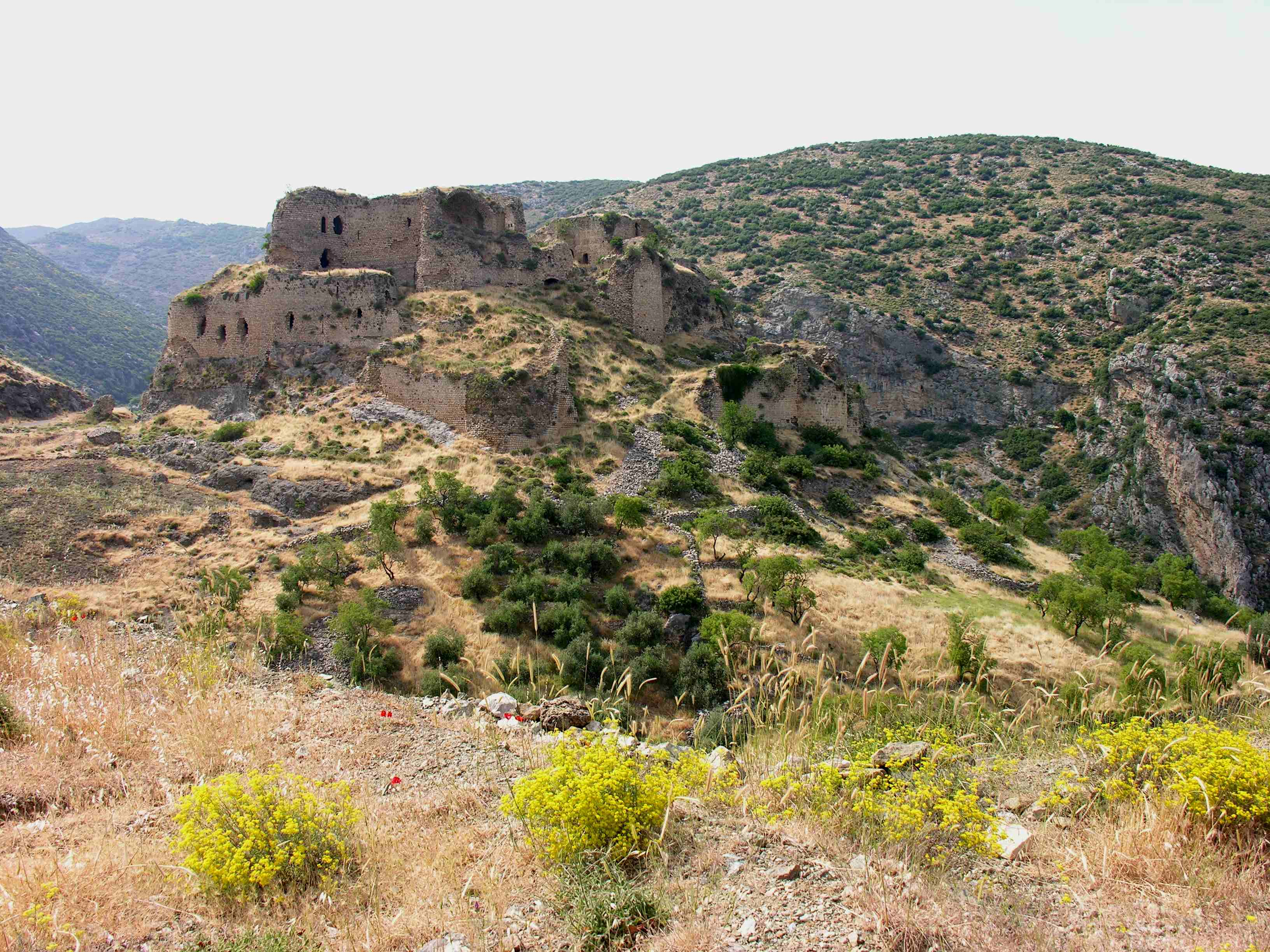
The ruins of Bagras Castle, viewed from the southeast

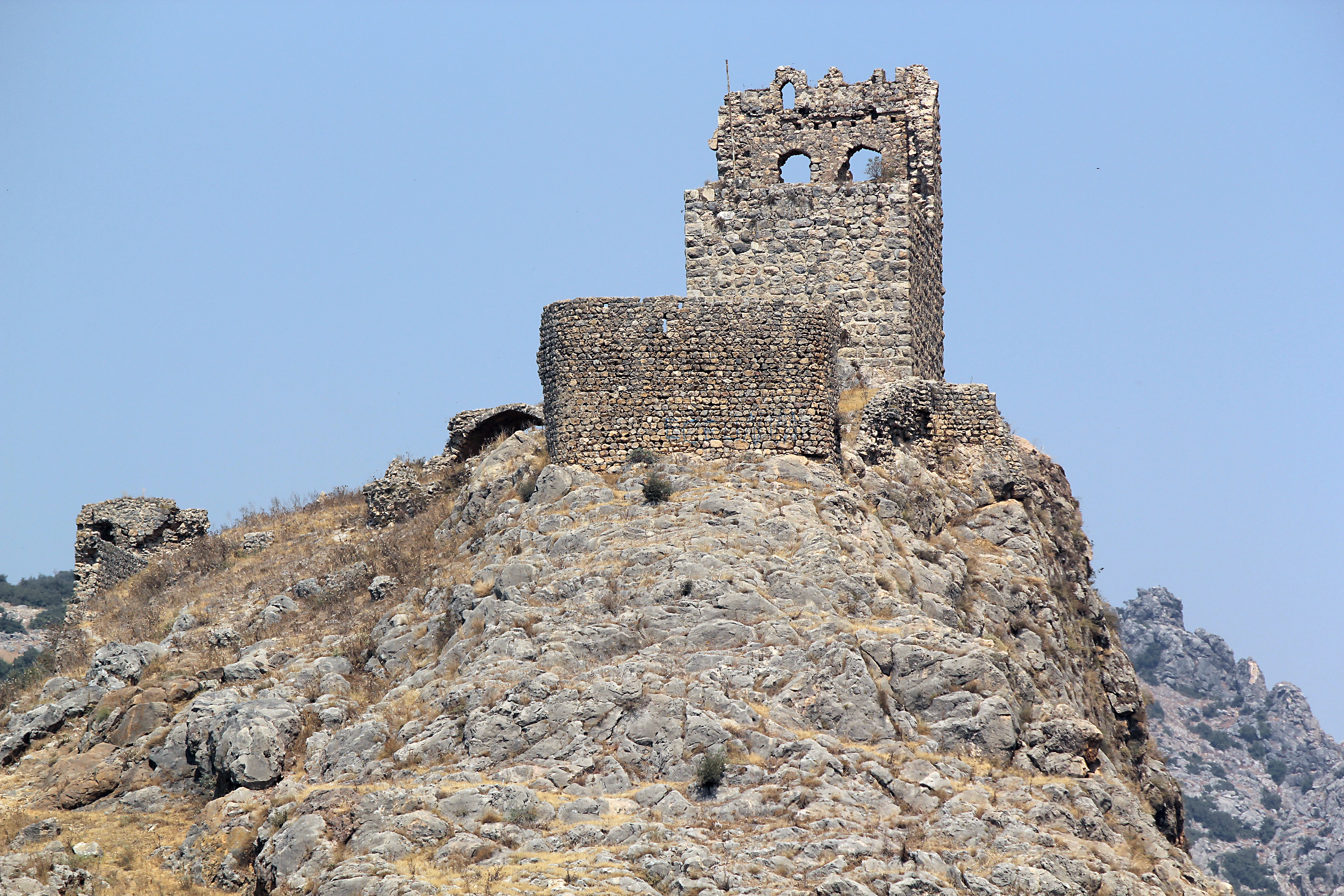
The ruins of Amouda Castle

Crusader castles from modern-day Turkey were mainly built by the Armenian Kingdom of Cilicia (1198–1375) and two Crusader states, the Principality of Antioch (1198–1268) and the County of Edessa (1198–1144).

- Anavarza Castle
- Antioch
- Amouda
- Ayasuluk Castle on Ayasuluk Hill, Selçuk (ancient Ephesus)
- Bagras
- Cursat, 36°5′46″N 36°11′59″E
- Geben
- Haruniye
- Kızkalesi
- Namrun Kalesi (Lampron)
- Rumkale
- Ravendel, 36°52′22″N 37°3′10″E
- Servantikar
- Silifke Castle
- Tece
- Tokmar Castle
- T‛il Hamtun
- Trapessac, 36°31′53″N 36°21′52″E
- Dumlu Kalesi, 37°9′1″N 35°42′5″E
- Yaka Castle

== See also ==
- List of castles
- List of castles in Jordan
- Ordensburg

== Bibliography ==
- Pringle, Denys (1997). Secular Buildings in the Crusader Kingdom of Jerusalem: An Archaeological Gazetteer. Cambridge University Press. ISBN 9780521460101.
