= Tokmar Castle =

Castle ruin in Mersin, Turkey

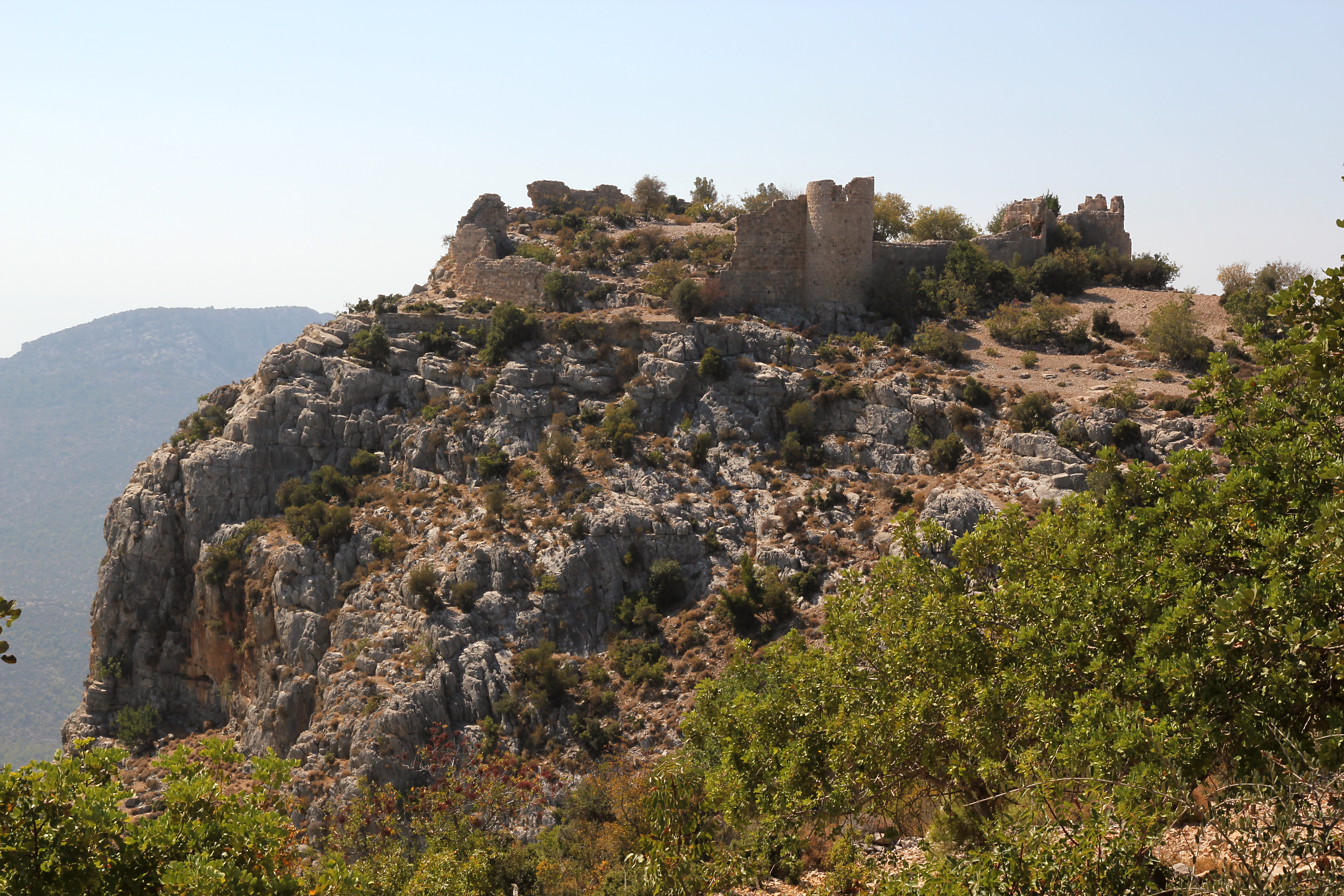

Tokmar Castle (Turkish: Tokmar Kalesi, Latin: Castellum Novumola) is a castle ruin in Mersin Province, Turkey

== Location ==
The castle is in the rural area of Silifke district of Mersin Province at 36°15′24″N 33°46′14″E. It is on a plateau at the southern slopes of Toros Mountains overlooking the Mediterranean Sea. The altitude is 380 metres (1,250 ft) and the birds' flight distance to sea shore is 3 kilometres (1.9 mi) which makes the castle an excellent observation point. The distance to main highway (D 400 ) is 4 kilometres (2.5 mi), to Silifke is 33 kilometres (21 mi) and to Mersin is 116 kilometres (72 mi).

== History ==
The castle was built by Byzantine Empire in the 12th century. Later on, it was captured by the Armenian Kingdom of Cilicia. In 1210, it was incorporated into the realm of Knights Hospitaller. It was later on captured by the Karamanids and finally by the Ottoman Empire in the late 15th century.

== Construction ==
There are sharp cliffs at the south of the castle . But other sides are quite unprotected. Thus there are defense towers at the north. Although most of the walls stand, the buildings in the castle have since been completely demolished.

== Gallery ==
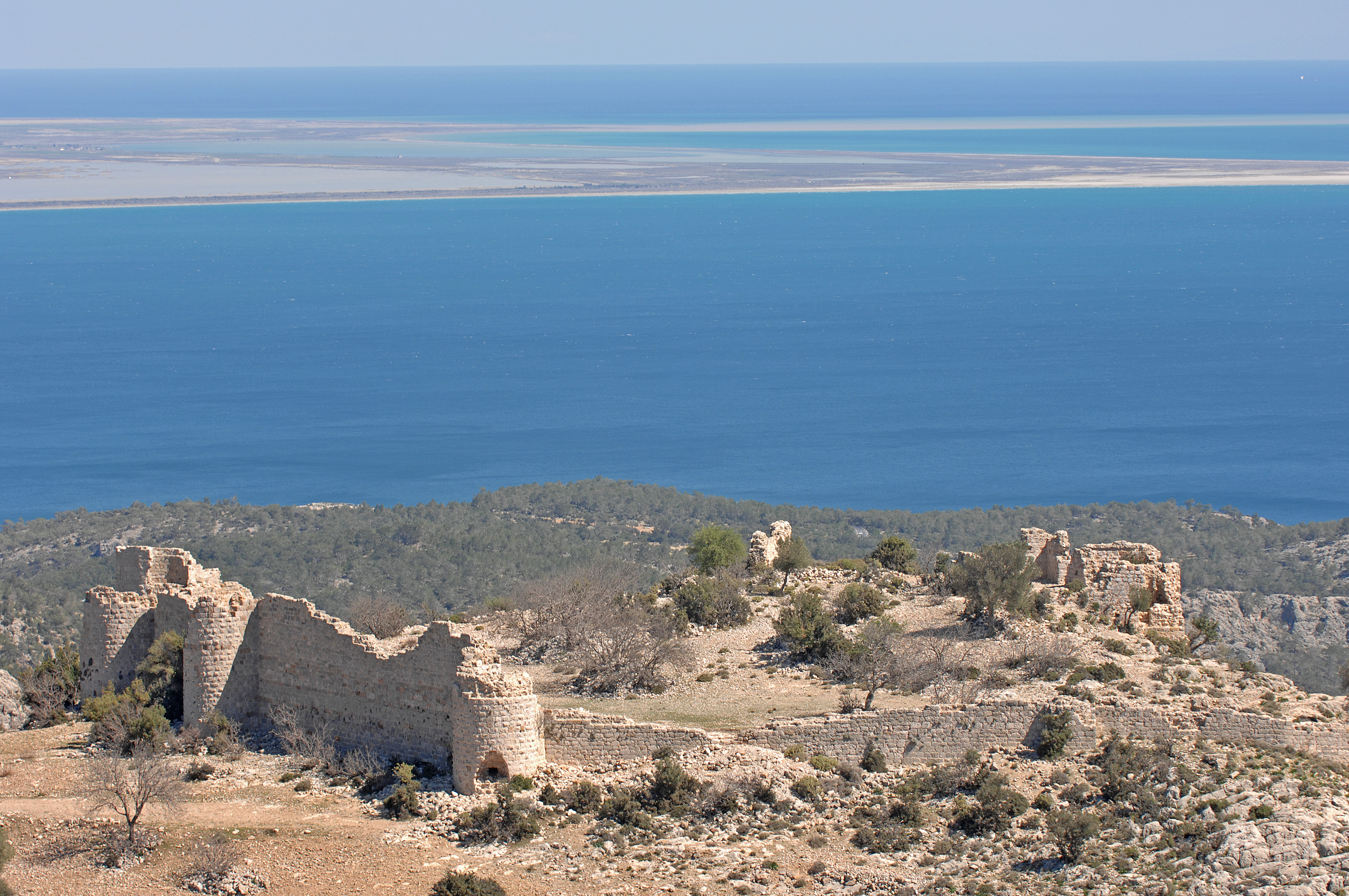
Tokmar Kalesi from outside

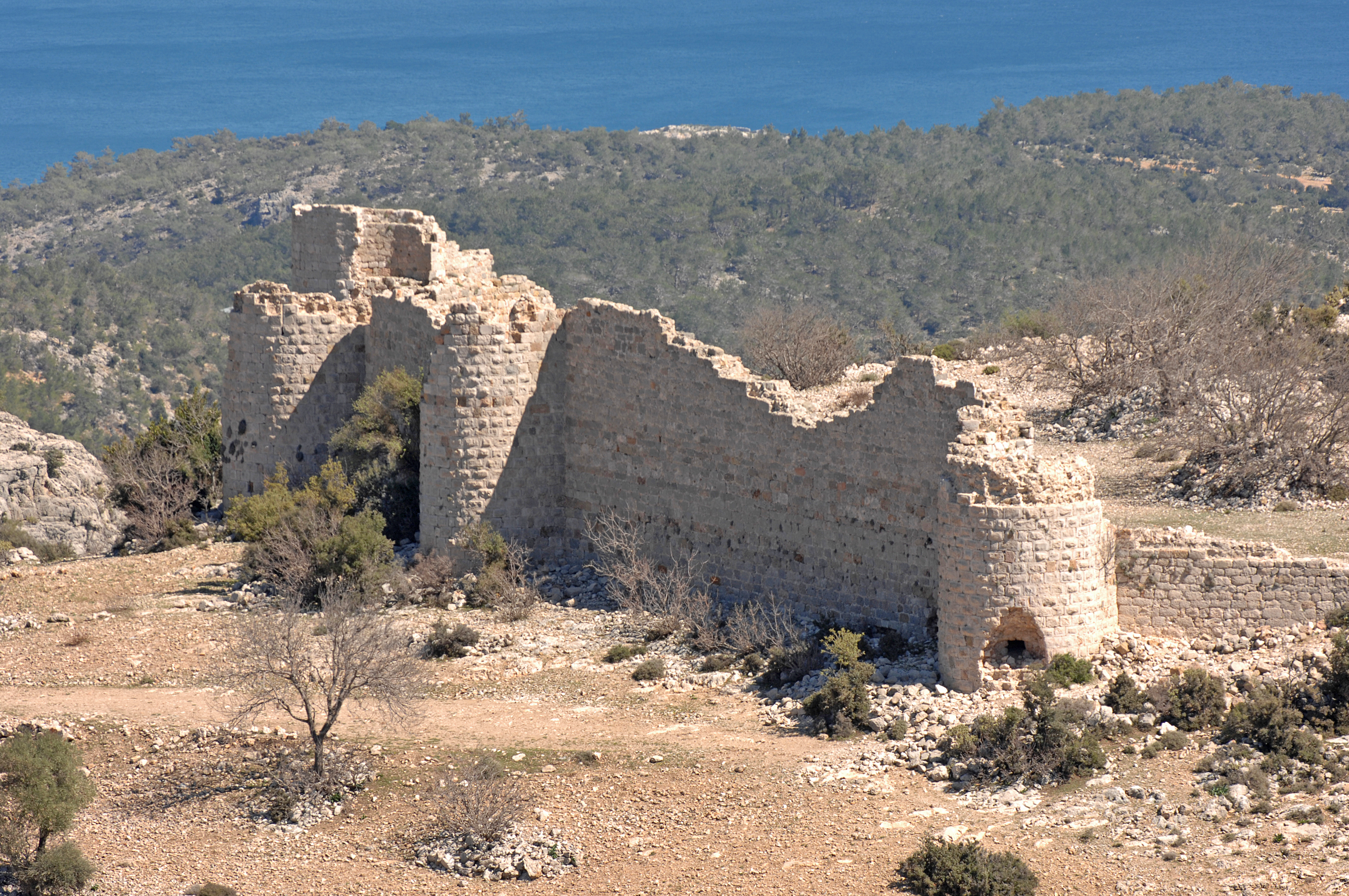
Tokmar Kalesi walls

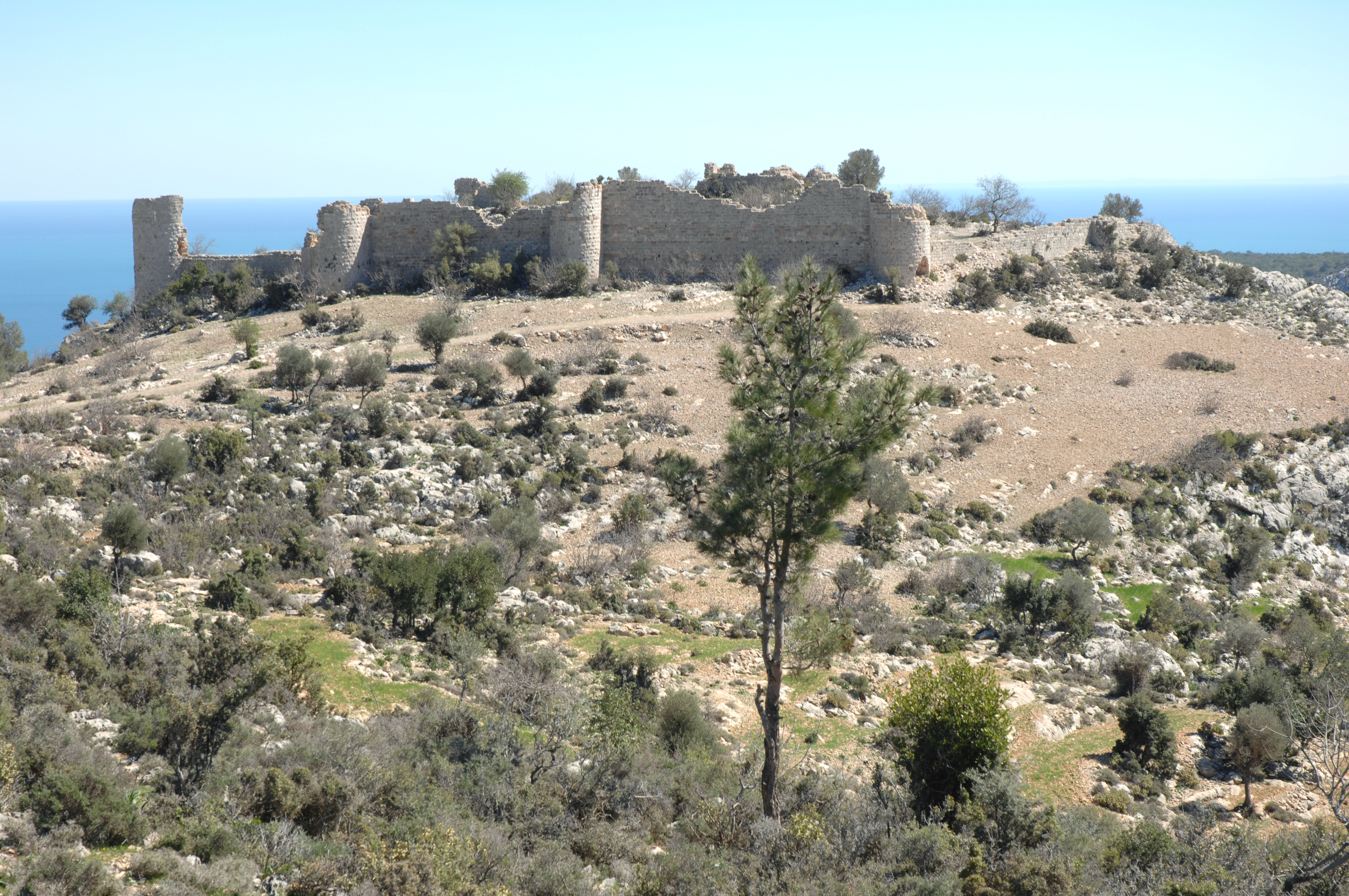
Tokmar Kalesi full view

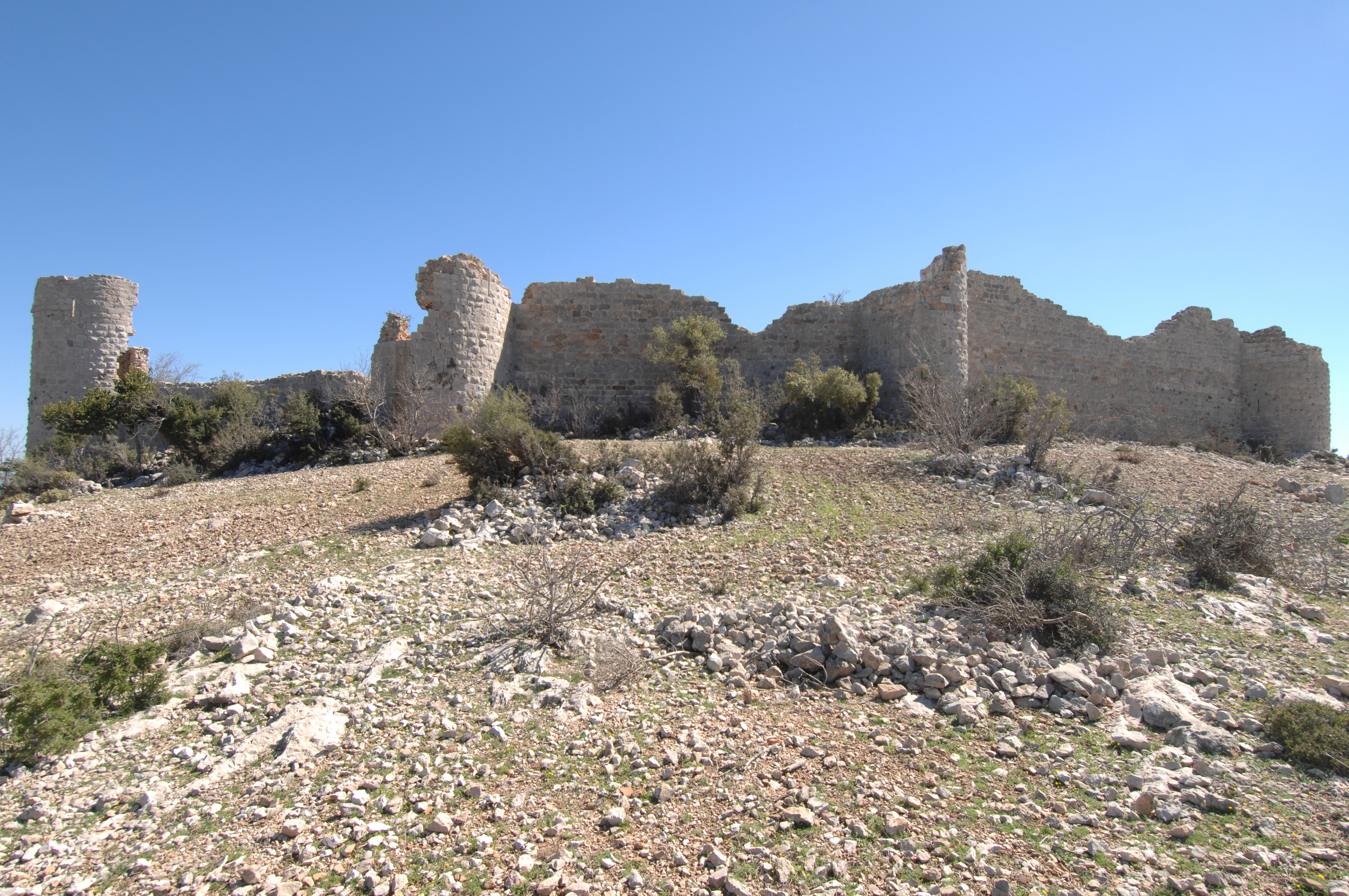
Tokmar Kalesi getting near

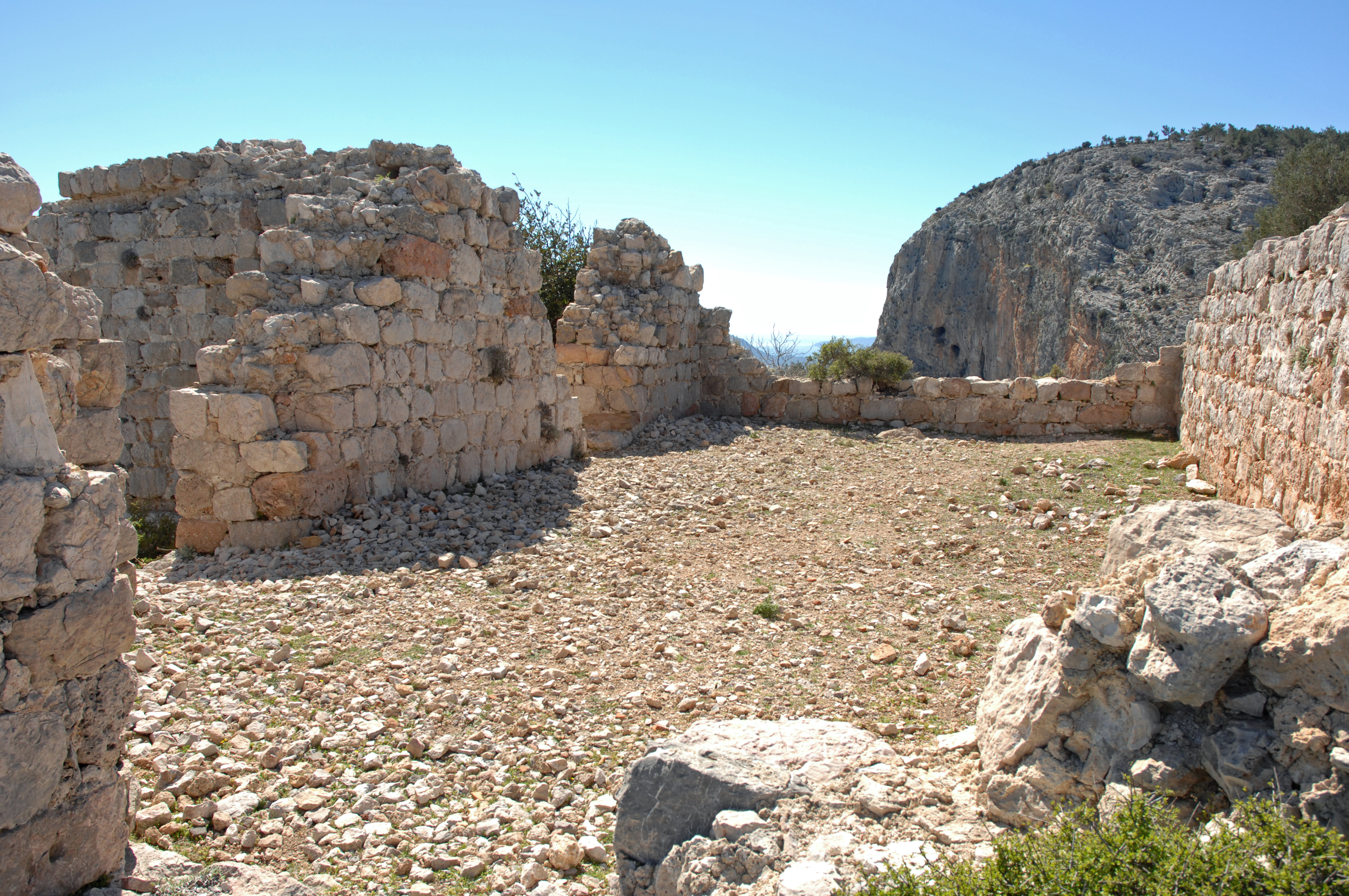
Tokmar Kalesi ruins

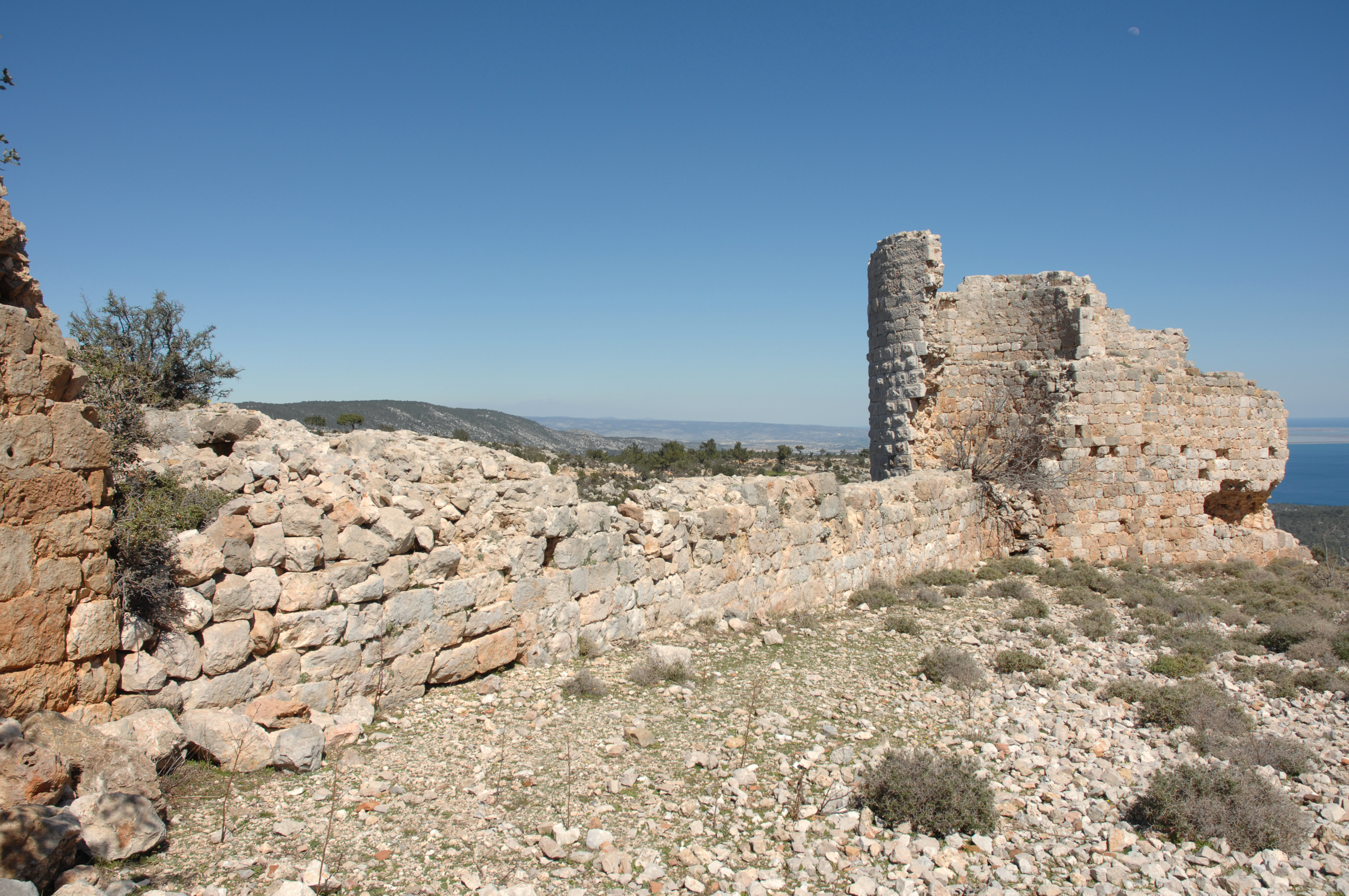
Tokmar Kalesi ruins of wall and tower

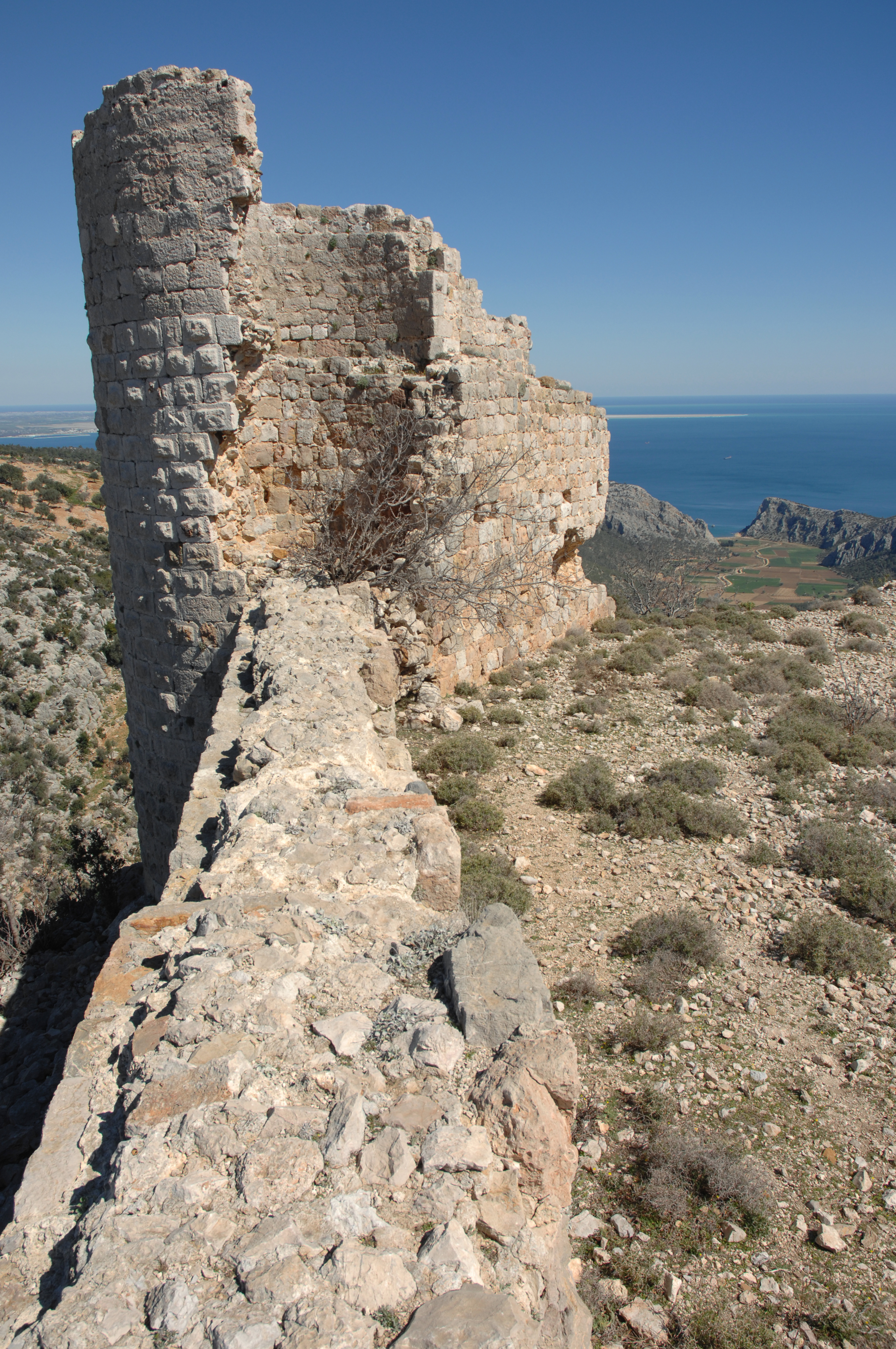
Tokmar Kalesi ruins of tower

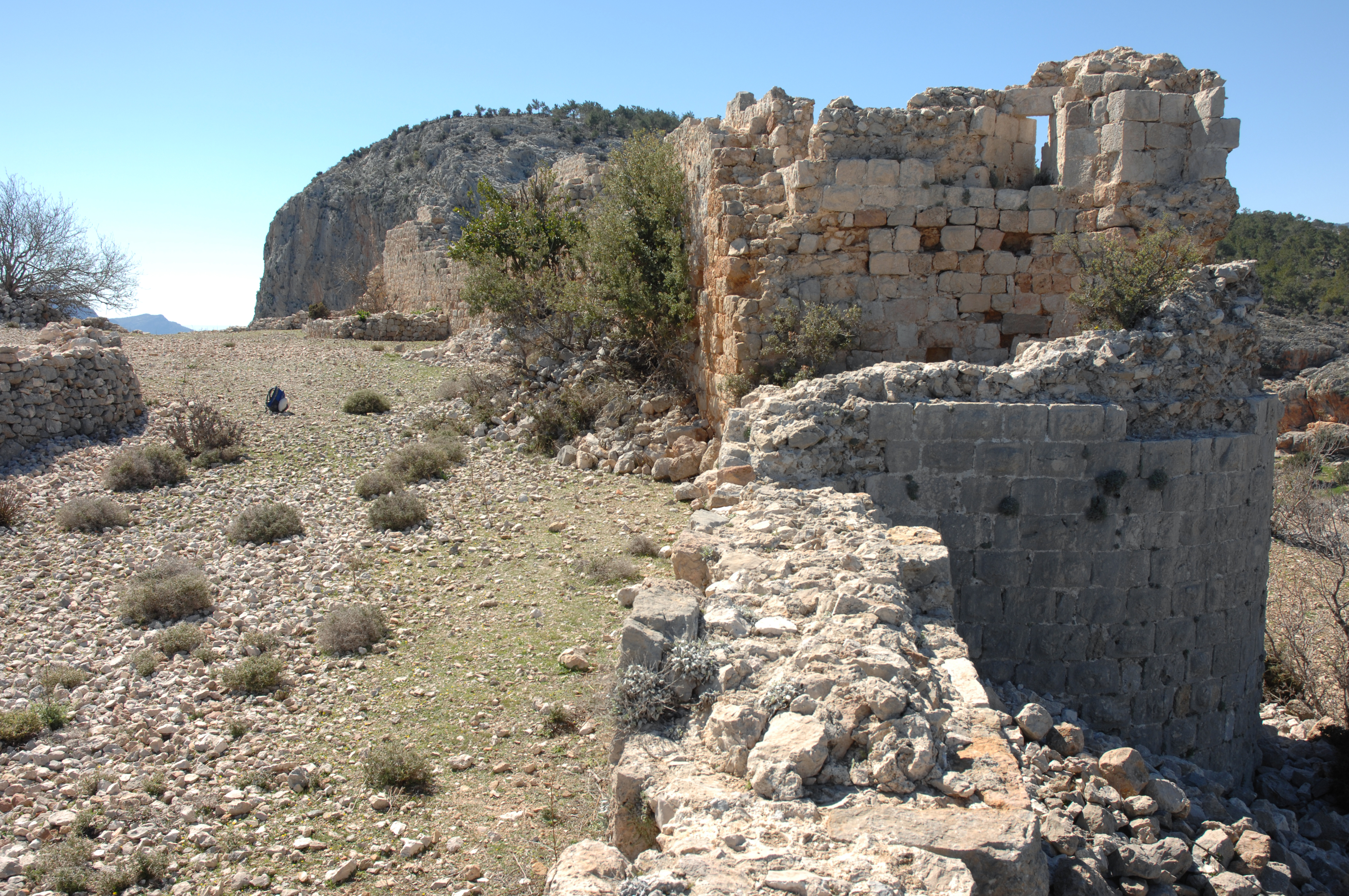
Tokmar Kalesi ruins of tower and wall

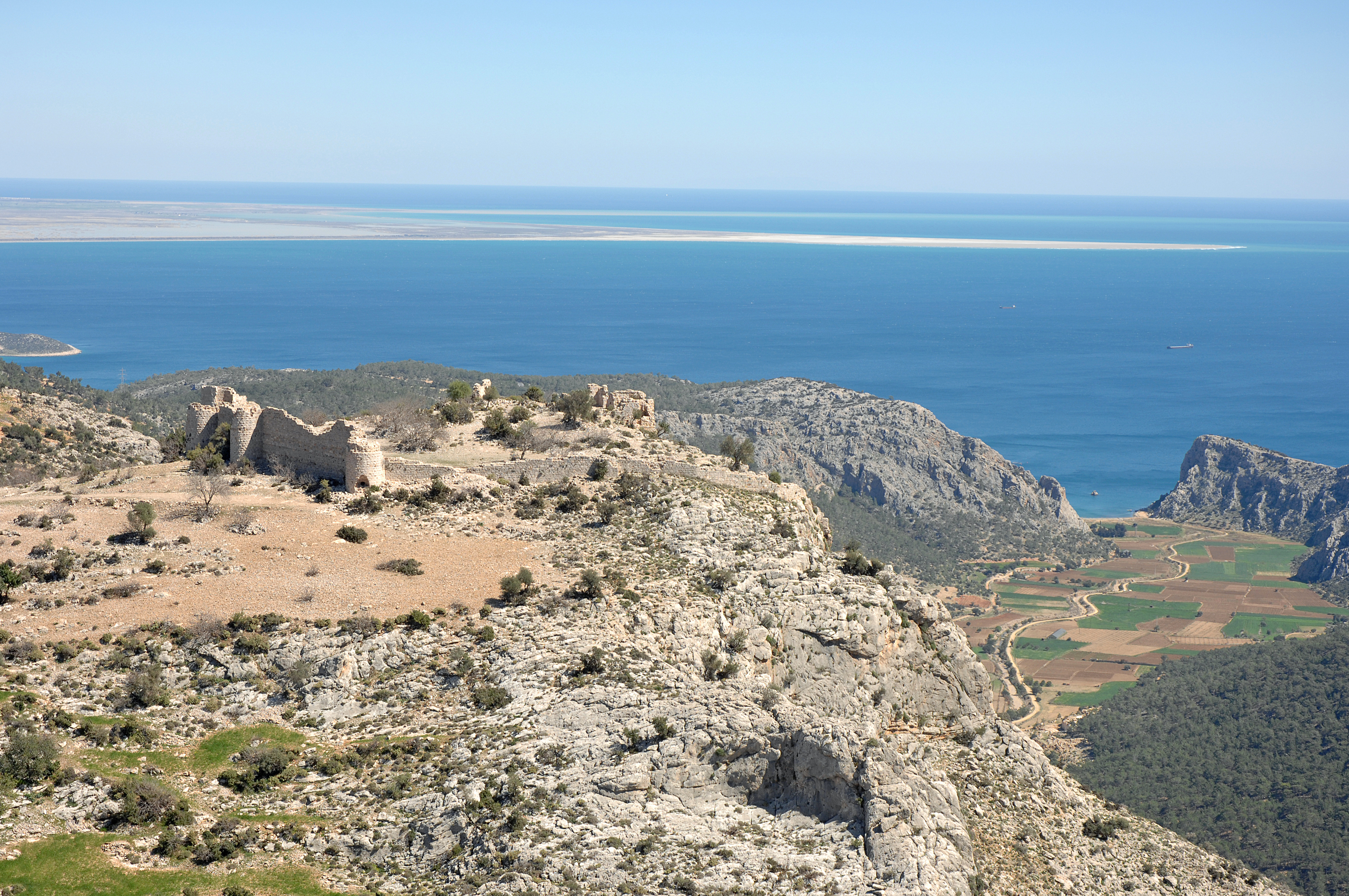
Tokmar Kalesi in its setting

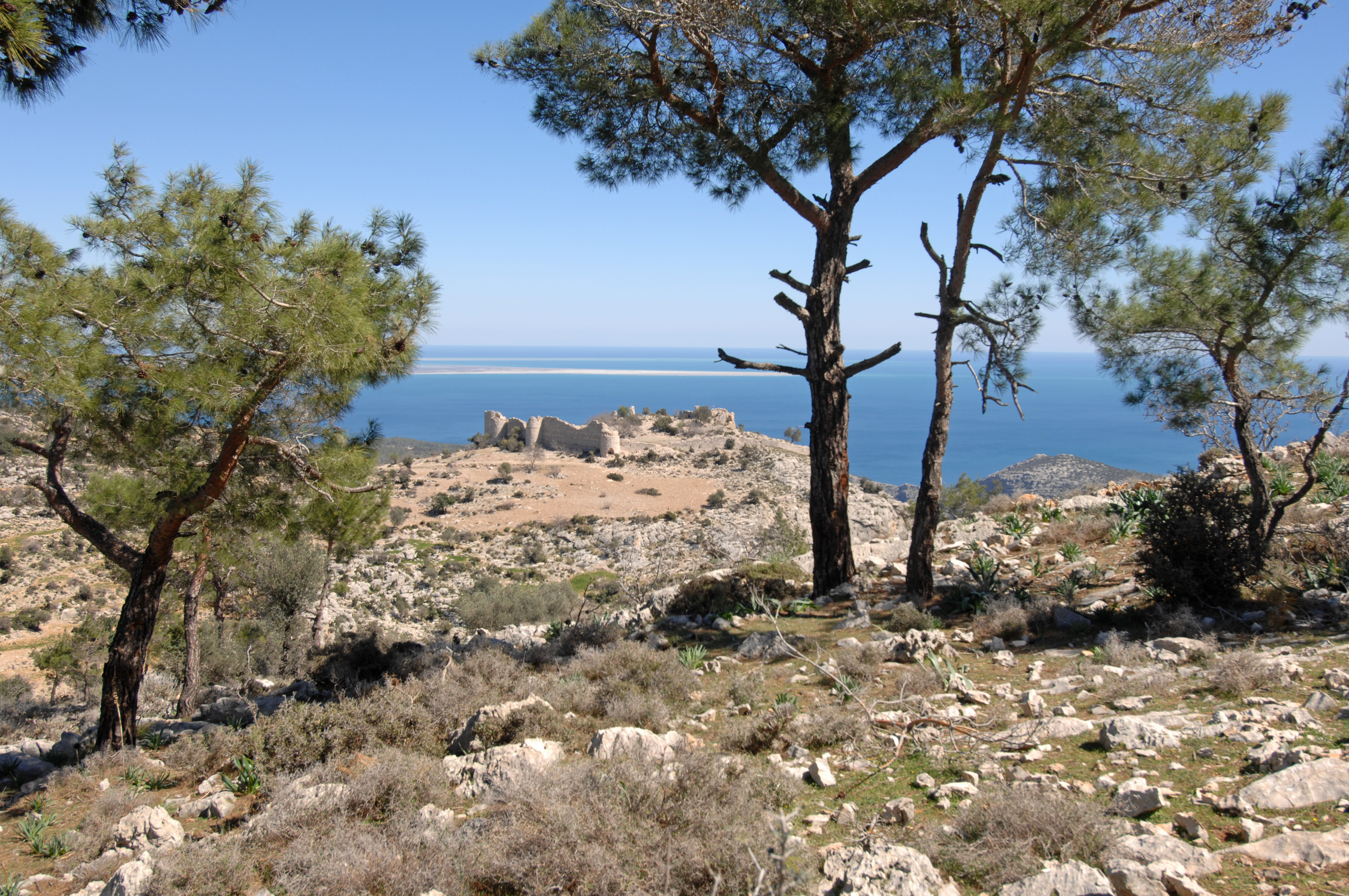
Tokmar Kalesi from within woodland

== See also ==
- List of Crusader castles
