= Jupunba alexandri var. troyana =

Conservation status
- Near Threatened (IUCN 2.3)

Scientific classification
- Kingdom: Plantae
- Clade: Tracheophytes
- Clade: Angiosperms
- Clade: Eudicots
- Clade: Rosids
- Order: Fabales
- Family: Fabaceae
- Subfamily: Caesalpinioideae
- Clade: Mimosoid clade
- Genus: Jupunba
- Species: J. alexandri
- Variety: J. a. var. troyana

Trinomial name
- Jupunba alexandri var. troyana (Urb.) M.V.B.Soares, M.P.Morim & Iganci

Synonyms
- Abarema alexandri var. troyana (Urb.) Barneby & J.W.Grimes; Jupunba troyana (Urb.) Britton & Rose; Pithecellobium alexandri var. troyanum Urb.

Variety of legume

Abarema alexandri var. troyana is a variety of the legume J. alexandri in the family Fabaceae. It is a tree endemic to Jamaica, where it can be found in woodland or thicket on limestone soils.

The plant was first described as Pithecellobium alexandri var. troyanum by Ignatz Urban in 1908. In 1996 Rupert Charles Barneby and James Walter Grimes move the variety and its parent species to genus Abarema as Aberema alexandri var. troyana. In 2021 Marcos Vinicius Batista Soares, Marli Pires Morim, and João Ricardo Vieira Iganci moved the species to genus Jupunba as Jupunba alexandri var. troyana.
