= Yasha =

Yasha may refer to:

== People with the name ==
- Gu Yasha (born 1990), Chinese footballer
- Nidhi Yasha (born 1983), Indian costume designer
- Yasha Khalili (born 1988), Iranian footballer
- Yasha as a diminutive of the Slavic given name Yakov, Jacob:
  - Yasha Asley (born 2003), British mathematics child prodigy
  - Yasha Levine (born 1981), Russian-American investigative journalist and author
  - Yasha Malekzad (born 1984), English music video director and producer
  - Yasha Manasherov (born 1980), Israeli Greco-Roman amateur wrestler

== Arts and entertainment ==
=== Anime and manga ===
- Yasha (manga), a Japanese manga series by Akimi Yoshida
- Yasha Gozen, a Japanese one-shot manga by Ryoko Yamagishi
- Yashahime: Princess Half-Demon, a Japanese anime series and the sequel to Inuyasha

=== Fictional characters ===
- Yasha, in the 1904 Russian play The Cherry Orchard by Anton Chekhov
- Yasha, in the 1990 Soviet adventure film Passport
- Yasha, in the 1993 Japanese anime film Yu Yu Hakusho: The Movie
- Yasha, in the 2012 Japanese action video game Asura's Wrath
- Yasha Nydoorin, in the American D&D web series Critical Role
- Yasha-ō, in the Japanese manga series RG Veda

== Other uses ==
- Yasha or yaksha, nature-spirits in Hindu and Buddhist mythology, sometimes depicted as demonic warriors

== See also ==
- Jascha
- Yash (disambiguation)
- Yaksha (disambiguation)
- Yeshua (disambiguation)
