= Yakkha =

Yakkha may refer to:

- Yakkha people, an ethnic group of South Asia
- Yakkha language, a Sino-Tibetan language
- Yaksha, also known as yakkha, a class of spirits in South and Southeast Asian cultures

== See also ==
- Yakka (disambiguation)
- Yaksha (disambiguation)
