= Yaka language =

Yaka may refer to the following languages of Africa:

- Yaka language (Congo–Angola), the most populous, spoken in Angola and the Democratic Republic of the Congo
  - One of the other Yaka languages
- Yaka language (Kivu), a minor language on the north shore of Lake Kivu, in the east of the Democratic Republic of the Congo
- Yaka language (Lékoumou), in the Lékoumou department of the Republic of the Congo
- Yaka language (Ubangi), or Aka, spoken along the Ubangi River between the Republic of the Congo and the Central African Republic
- Yaka language (Cameroon), spoken in Cameroon, the Republic of the Congo and the Central Africa Republic
- Yaka language, a dialect of West Teke language, spoken in the Republic of Congo and Gabon

== See also ==
- Yakkha language, spoken in Nepal and India
- Yakan language, spoken in the Philippines
