= International Association of Crime Analysts =

The International Association of Crime Analysts (IACA) is a professional association founded in 1990 to provide training, literature, networking, and professional development resources to individuals involved in the crime analysis profession. It also advocates for the development and improvement of crime analysis programs in law enforcement agencies. As of August 2019, the IACA had 4,059 members from 59 nations, with the majority in the United States, Canada, Mexico, Colombia, Ireland, Trinidad and Tobago, Chile, the Netherlands, South Africa, and Australia.

The IACA is an all-volunteer association, incorporated in the U.S. as a 501(c)(3) non-profit. Most of its members work in police agencies or for government programs that provide services to police. The primary services of the association are an annual training conference, annual international symposiums, a Certified Law Enforcement Analyst (CLEA) credential, a mentoring program for new analysts, a series of professional training classes (both in-person and online), webinars, and publications, including a comprehensive text of the profession titled Exploring Crime Analysis. In recent years, the IACA has made significant strides in growing its Latin American membership by increasing Spanish-language webinars, publications, and other services.

The IACA is governed by a five-member executive board elected by the association's members. It does not restrict membership to individuals already employed in policing, but rather welcomes students, educators, other police professionals, and anyone else with a demonstrated interest in crime analysis. The annual membership fee is $25 US.
