= Joscha =

Joscha is a unisex given name, found in Germany and Switzerland. Notable people with this name include:

- Joscha Bach (born 1973), a German AI and cognitive science researcher
- Joscha Burkhalter (born 1996), a Swiss biathlete
- Joscha Kiefer (born 1982), a German actor
- Joscha Remus (born 1958), a German author
- Joscha Schmierer (born 1942), a German politician and author
- Joscha Wosz (born 2002), a German football player
