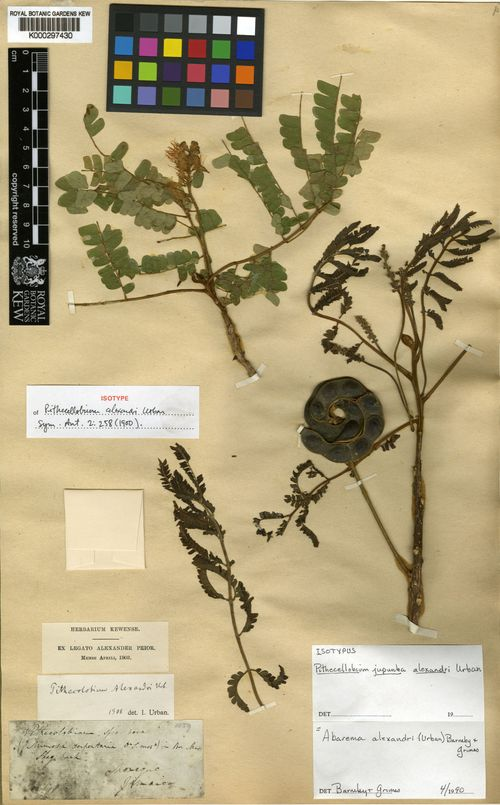
- Isotype K000297430, collected in Jamaica in 1849

Conservation status
- Near Threatened (IUCN 2.3)

Scientific classification
- Kingdom: Plantae
- Clade: Tracheophytes
- Clade: Angiosperms
- Clade: Eudicots
- Clade: Rosids
- Order: Fabales
- Family: Fabaceae
- Subfamily: Caesalpinioideae
- Clade: Mimosoid clade
- Genus: Jupunba
- Species: J. alexandri

Binomial name
- Jupunba alexandri (Urb.) Britton & Rose

Varieties
- Jupunba alexandri var. alexandri; Jupunba alexandri var. troyana (Urb.) M.V.B.Soares, M.P.Morim & Iganci

Synonyms
- Abarema alexandri (Urb.) Barneby & J.W.Grimes; Pithecellobium alexandri (Urb.) Urb.; Pithecellobium jupunba var. alexandri Urb.

= Jupunba alexandri =

Species of legume

Jupunba alexandri (synonym Abarema alexandri) is a species of plant of the genus Jupunba in the family Fabaceae. It is a tree endemic to Jamaica, where it can be found in woodland or thicket on limestone soils.

== Taxonomy ==
It was first described in 1900 as Pithecellobium jupunba var. alexandri by Ignatz Urban, who redescribed it in 1908 as Pithecellobium alexandri. The name accepted for this species by most authorities is Jupunba alexandri (Urb.) Britton & Rose, a name given in 1928 by the American botanists, Nathaniel Lord Britton and Joseph Nelson Rose.

== Varieties ==
Two varieties are accepted.

- Jupunba alexandri var. alexandri
- Jupunba alexandri var. troyana (Urb.) M.V.B.Soares, M.P.Morim & Iganci
