= Yaka Castle =

Ruined castle in Mersin Province, Turkey

- Mersin Province, Turkey
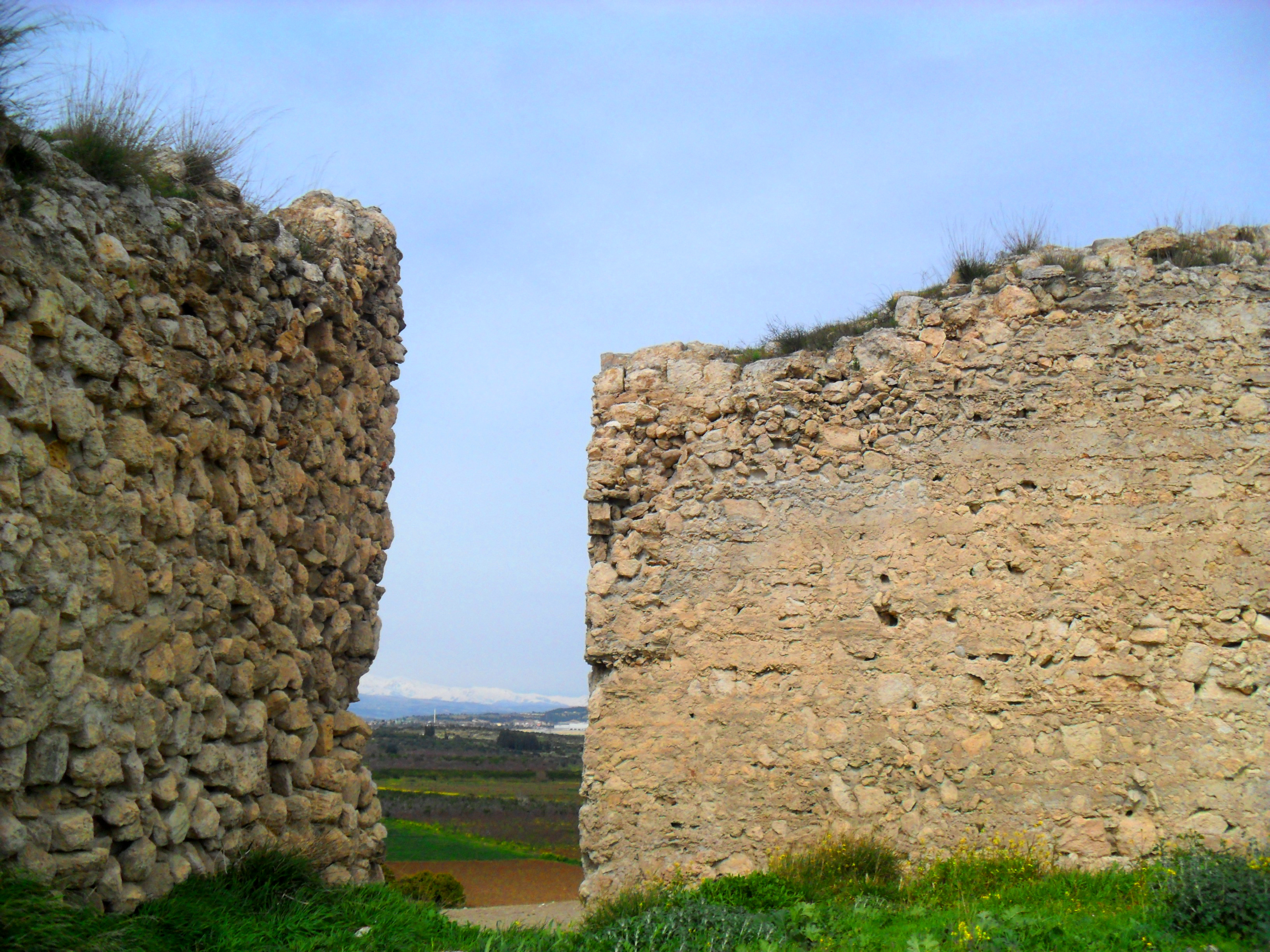
- Two walls

Site information
- Type: Castle
- Controlled by: Ministry of Culture
- Open to the public: Yes
- Condition: Only two walls

Location
- Coordinates: 36°51′40″N 34°44′04″E

Site history
- Built by: Crusaders
- Demolished: Most of it

Yaka Castle (also known as Güdübeş Castle) is a castle ruin in Mersin Province, Turkey. Although its name is Güdübeş, it is popularly known as Yaka referring to a former village to the east of the castle.

== Geography ==
The castle is to the east of Mersin. It can be reached by a short lane from the Turkish state highway D.400 which connects Mersin to Tarsus. Its distance to Mersin is 15 kilometres (9.3 mi).

== History ==
The castle was built by Crusaders in medieval times and nothing is known about its history.

== The plan ==
The plan of the castle is square. But only two walls (north and west) are partially standing. There are three observation towers. The plan of the one at the south east corner is square, the plan of the one at the east is circular and the plan of the one at north east corner is polygonal. Because the masonry is so dissimilar to that used by the Armenians and the Byzantines in Cilicia and because parts of this coastal region were occupied by the Knights Hospitaller in the late 12th and 13th centuries, it is possible that the site was constructed by the Crusaders.

== See also ==
- List of Crusader castles
