= Jascha Lieberman =

Polish violinist and violist

- Born: Kraków, Poland
- Genres: Klezmer, classical, Balkan jazz
- Occupation: Musician
- Instruments: Violin, viola
- Years active: 1979–present
- Labels: Universal, NLD
- Website: JaschaLieberman.net

Jascha Lieberman is a Polish violinist and violist. He studied with Stefan Kamasa, Giora Feidman, and Lepold Kozłowski. Lieberman was a member of the string quartet conducted by Krzysztof Penderecki.

== Festivals ==
He performed in numerous festivals, most important of which are:

- Sagra Malatestiana Rimini, Italy
- Schleswig-Holstein Music Festival, Germany
- Verbier Festival & Academy, Switzerland

== Jascha Lieberman Trio ==
Jascha Lieberman Trio
- Origin: Kraków, Poland
- Genres: Klezmer, Balkan, Jazz
- Years active: 1995–present
- Labels: Universal, NLD Records
- Members: Jascha Lieberman; Konrad Ligas; Łukasz Pawlikowski; Józef Michalik; Wiesław Ochwat
- Past members: Jacek Hołubowski; Mirosław Kasperek; Grzegorz Bąk; Paweł Iwan; Roman Ślazyk; Mateusz Frankiewicz; Andrzej Włodarz; Sławomir Berny
- Website: jaschalieberman.net

Jascha Lieberman Trio is a klezmer band from Kraków, Poland, formed in 1995.

The musicians play traditional Jewish music, classical music, and jazz. They did perform on television, radio and in concerts in Europe and North America.

== Discography ==
- Remembrance of Kazimierz (1999)
- The Bats Gallery (2010)

== See also ==
- Giora Feidman
- Klezmer music
