= Yaksha (rural locality) =

Yaksha (Russian: Якша) is the name of several rural localities in Russia:

- Yaksha, Komi Republic, a settlement in Yaksha Rural-Type Settlement Administrative Territory of Troitsko-Pechorsky District in the Komi Republic; 61°50′N 56°51′E
- Yaksha, Kostroma Oblast, a settlement in Petrovskoye Settlement of Chukhlomsky District in Kostroma Oblast; 58°46′N 43°3′E
