= TRNAIle-lysidine synthase =

tRNA^{Ile}-lysidine synthase

Identifiers
- EC no.: 6.3.4.19
- CAS no.: 635304-92-6

Databases
- IntEnz: IntEnz view
- BRENDA: BRENDA entry
- ExPASy: NiceZyme view
- KEGG: KEGG entry
- MetaCyc: metabolic pathway
- PRIAM: profile
- PDB structures: RCSB PDB PDBe PDBsum
Search
- PMC: articles
- PubMed: articles
- NCBI: proteins

tRNA^{Ile}-lysidine synthase (EC 6.3.4.19, TilS, mesJ (gene), yacA (gene), isoleucine-specific transfer ribonucleate lysidine synthetase, tRNA^{Ile}-lysidine synthetase) is an enzyme with systematic name L-lysine:tRNA^{Ile_{2}}–cytidine_{34} ligase (AMP-forming). This enzyme catalyses the following chemical reaction

tRNA^{Ile_{2}}-cytidine_{34} + L-lysine + ATP $\rightleftharpoons$ tRNA^{Ile_{2}}-lysidine_{34} + AMP + diphosphate + H_{2}O

The bacterial enzyme modifies the wobble base of the CAU anticodon of tRNA^{Ile} at the oxo group in position 2 of cytidine_{34}.
