= Chacoense =

Chacoense may refer to:

- Achryson chacoense, species of longhorn beetle
- Capsicum chacoense, species of plant
- Chloroleucon chacoense, species of flowering plant
- Mesorhizobium chacoense, species of bacteria
- Solanum chacoense, species of wild potato
