= Cerdaia lunata =

Scientific classification
- Kingdom: Animalia
- Phylum: Arthropoda
- Class: Insecta
- Order: Coleoptera
- Suborder: Polyphaga
- Infraorder: Cucujiformia
- Family: Cerambycidae
- Subfamily: Cerambycinae
- Tribe: Achrysonini
- Genus: Cerdaia
- Species: C. lunata

Binomial name
- Cerdaia lunata (Germain, 1898)

Synonyms
- Compsa lunata Blackwelder, 1946; Pehuenia lunata Martins, 2000; Xenocompsa lunata Martins, 1965

Species of beetle

Cerdaia lunata is a species of longhorn beetle in the Cerambycinae subfamily. It was described by Germain in 1898. It is known from Chile.
