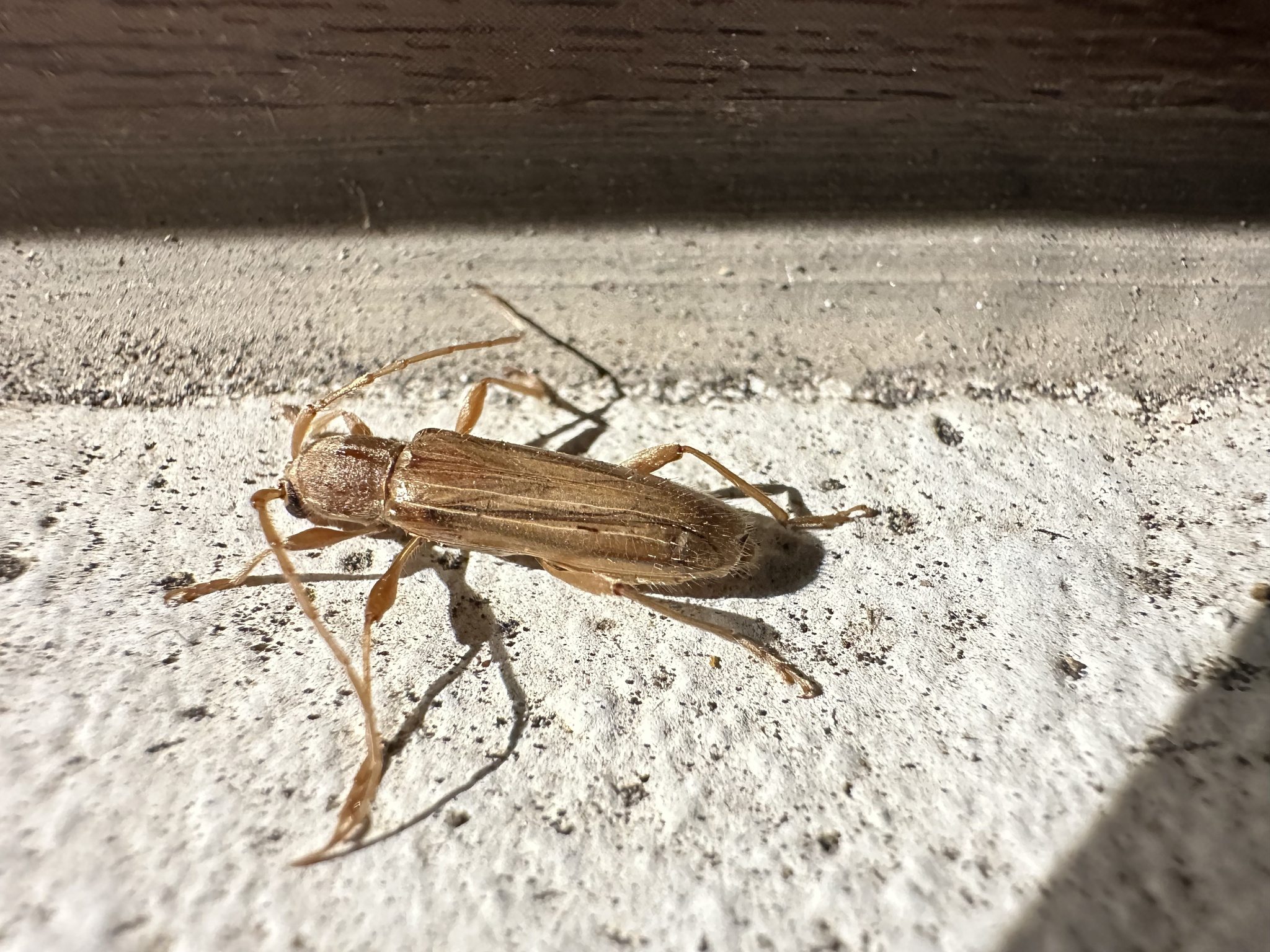
- Xenocompsa flavonitida, Chile

Scientific classification
- Kingdom: Animalia
- Phylum: Arthropoda
- Class: Insecta
- Order: Coleoptera
- Suborder: Polyphaga
- Infraorder: Cucujiformia
- Family: Cerambycidae
- Subfamily: Cerambycinae
- Tribe: Achrysonini
- Genus: Xenocompsa
- Species: X. flavonitida

Binomial name
- Xenocompsa flavonitida (Fairmaire & Germain, 1859)

Synonyms
- Compsa flavonitida Germain, 1898; Compsa flavonitida bifasciata Blackwelder, 1946; Grammicosum bifasciatum R.Philippi & F.Philippi, 1860; Grammicosum flavo-nitidum Redtenbacher, 1868; Grammicosum flavonitidum F.Philippi, 1887

= Xenocompsa flavonitida =

Species of beetle

Xenocompsa flavonitida is a species in the longhorned beetle family Cerambycidae. It is found in western Argentina and Chile.
