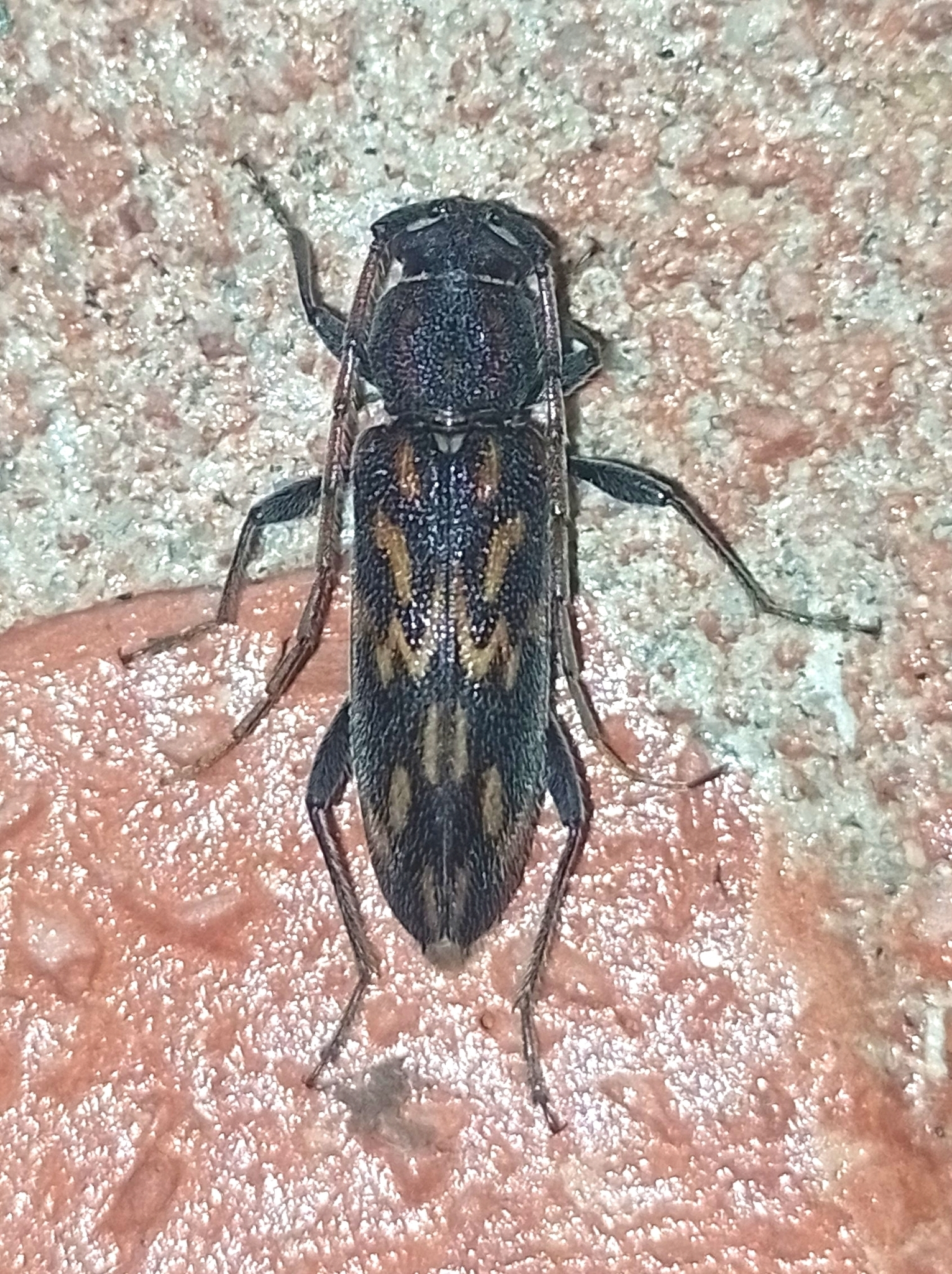
- Achryson undulatum, Argentina

Scientific classification
- Kingdom: Animalia
- Phylum: Arthropoda
- Class: Insecta
- Order: Coleoptera
- Suborder: Polyphaga
- Infraorder: Cucujiformia
- Family: Cerambycidae
- Subfamily: Cerambycinae
- Tribe: Achrysonini
- Genus: Achryson
- Species: A. undulatum

Binomial name
- Achryson undulatum Burmeister, 1865

Synonyms
- Achryson undularium Yepes, 1928

= Achryson undulatum =

Species of beetle

Achryson undulatum is a species in the longhorned beetle family Cerambycidae. It is found in Uruguay, Argentina, Paraguay, and Brazil.

This species was described by Hermann Burmeister in 1865.
