= Xenocompsa semipolita =

Scientific classification
- Kingdom: Animalia
- Phylum: Arthropoda
- Class: Insecta
- Order: Coleoptera
- Suborder: Polyphaga
- Infraorder: Cucujiformia
- Family: Cerambycidae
- Subfamily: Cerambycinae
- Tribe: Achrysonini
- Genus: Xenocompsa
- Species: X. semipolita

Binomial name
- Xenocompsa semipolita (Fairmaire & Germain, 1859)

Synonyms
- Compsa pallidicornis Germain, 1898; Compsa semipolita Blackwelder, 1946; Compsa semipolita pallidicornis Blackwelder, 1946; Grammicosum semipolitum F.Philippi, 1887; Ibidion pallidicorne Thomson, 1867; Ibidion pallidicornis Gemminger & Harold, 1872

Species of beetle

Xenocompsa semipolita is a species in the longhorned beetle family Cerambycidae. It is found in Chile.
