= Allogaster geniculatus =

Scientific classification
- Domain: Eukaryota
- Kingdom: Animalia
- Phylum: Arthropoda
- Class: Insecta
- Order: Coleoptera
- Suborder: Polyphaga
- Infraorder: Cucujiformia
- Family: Cerambycidae
- Subfamily: Cerambycinae
- Tribe: Achrysonini
- Genus: Allogaster
- Species: A. geniculatus

Binomial name
- Allogaster geniculatus Thomson, 1864

Species of insect

Allogaster geniculatus is a species in the longhorned beetle family Cerambycidae. It is found in Mali, DR Congo, Niger, Ivory Coast, Gambia, and Sénégal.
