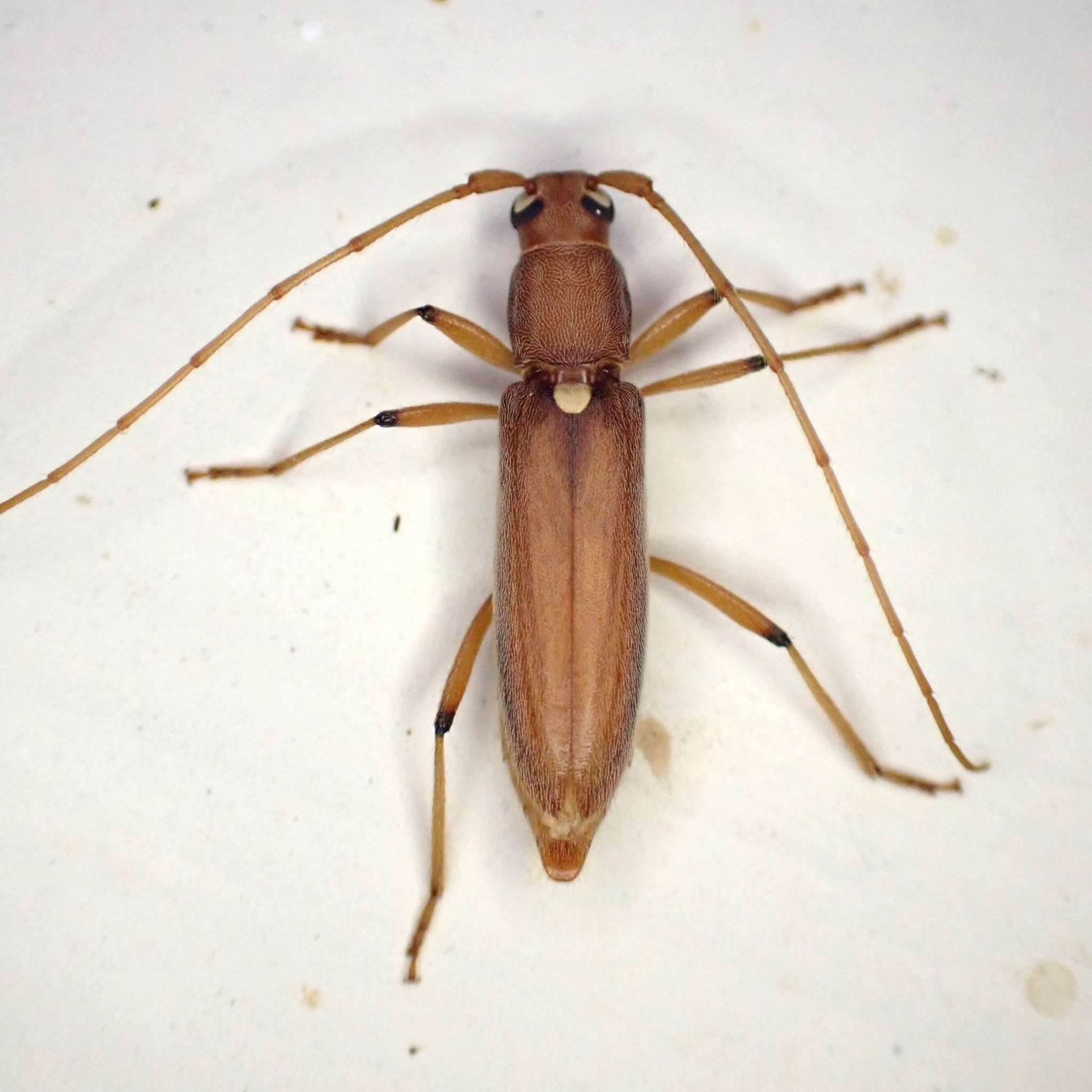
- Achryson immaculipenne, Bolivia

Scientific classification
- Kingdom: Animalia
- Phylum: Arthropoda
- Class: Insecta
- Order: Coleoptera
- Suborder: Polyphaga
- Infraorder: Cucujiformia
- Family: Cerambycidae
- Subfamily: Cerambycinae
- Tribe: Achrysonini
- Genus: Achryson
- Species: A. immaculipenne

Binomial name
- Achryson immaculipenne Gounelle, 1909

Synonyms
- Achryson inmaculipenne Di Iorio, 2004; Achryson unicolor Gounelle, 1909

= Achryson immaculipenne =

Species of beetle

Achryson immaculipenne is a species in the longhorned beetle family Cerambycidae. It is found in South American, and is known from Brazil, Paraguay, French Guiana, Venezuela, Bolivia, Argentina, Ecuador, and Colombia.
