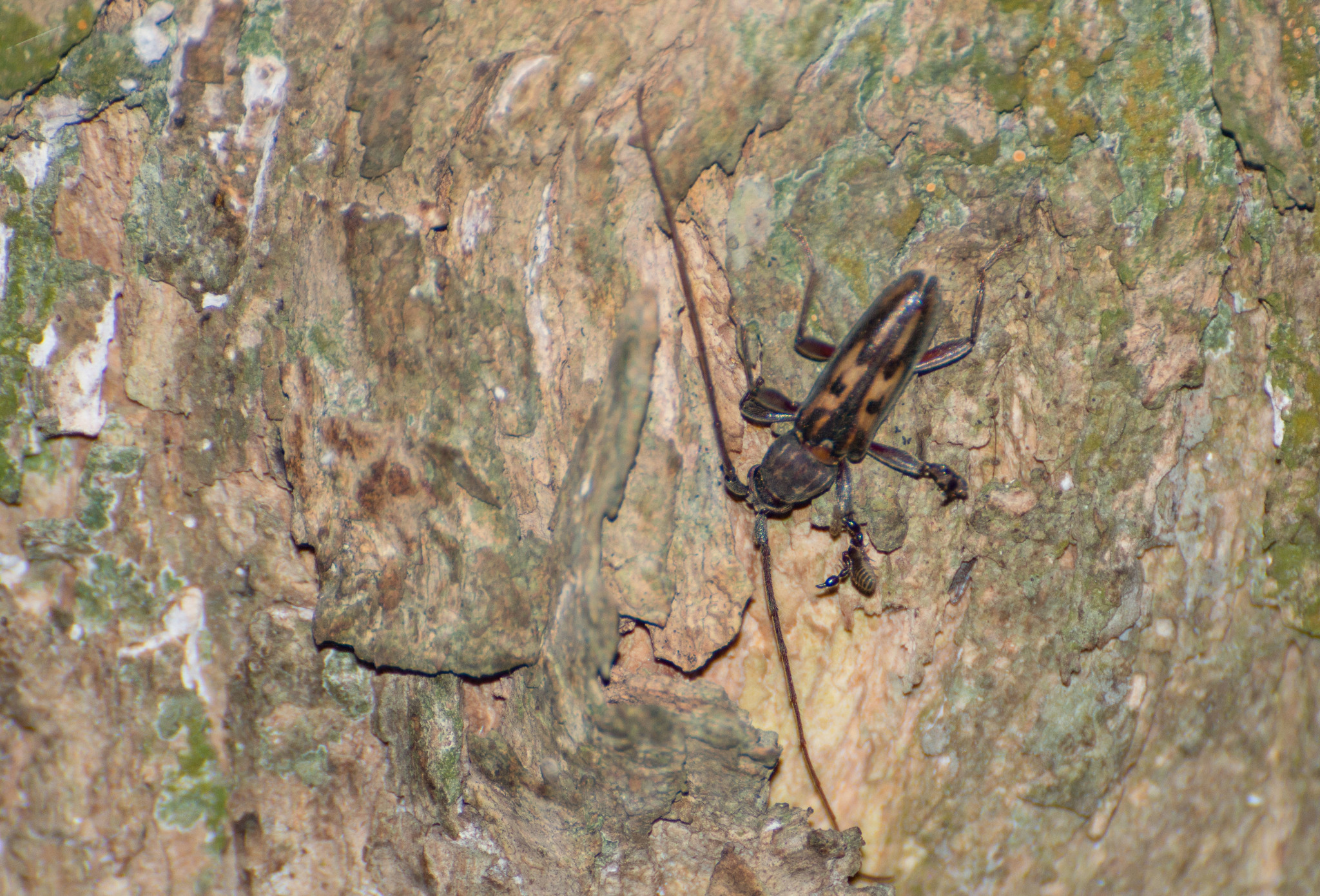
- Achryson foersteri, Argentina

Scientific classification
- Kingdom: Animalia
- Phylum: Arthropoda
- Class: Insecta
- Order: Coleoptera
- Suborder: Polyphaga
- Infraorder: Cucujiformia
- Family: Cerambycidae
- Subfamily: Cerambycinae
- Tribe: Achrysonini
- Genus: Achryson
- Species: A. foersteri

Binomial name
- Achryson foersteri Bosq, 1953

Synonyms
- Achryson lineolatum Zajciw & Monné, 1968; Achryson lutarium Ruffinelli & Carbonell, 1953

= Achryson foersteri =

Species of beetle

Achryson foersteri is a species in the longhorned beetle family Cerambycidae. It is found in Argentina, Brazil, Paraguay, and Uruguay.
