= Allogaster aethiopicus =

Scientific classification
- Domain: Eukaryota
- Kingdom: Animalia
- Phylum: Arthropoda
- Class: Insecta
- Order: Coleoptera
- Suborder: Polyphaga
- Infraorder: Cucujiformia
- Family: Cerambycidae
- Subfamily: Cerambycinae
- Tribe: Achrysonini
- Genus: Allogaster
- Species: A. aethiopicus

Binomial name
- Allogaster aethiopicus Adlbauer, 1999

Species of insect

Allogaster aethiopicus is a species in the longhorned beetle family Cerambycidae. It is known from Eritrea and Ethiopia.
