= Huequenia araucana =

Scientific classification
- Kingdom: Animalia
- Phylum: Arthropoda
- Class: Insecta
- Order: Coleoptera
- Suborder: Polyphaga
- Infraorder: Cucujiformia
- Family: Cerambycidae
- Subfamily: Cerambycinae
- Tribe: Achrysonini
- Genus: Huequenia
- Species: H. araucana

Binomial name
- Huequenia araucana (Cerda, 1980)

Synonyms
- Angolia araucana Cerda, 1980

Species of beetle

Huequenia araucana is a species in the longhorned beetle family Cerambycidae. It is found in Chile.
