= Xenocompsa martinsi =

Scientific classification
- Kingdom: Animalia
- Phylum: Arthropoda
- Class: Insecta
- Order: Coleoptera
- Suborder: Polyphaga
- Infraorder: Cucujiformia
- Family: Cerambycidae
- Subfamily: Cerambycinae
- Tribe: Achrysonini
- Genus: Xenocompsa
- Species: X. martinsi

Binomial name
- Xenocompsa martinsi Cerda, 1980

Species of beetle

Xenocompsa martinsi is a species in the longhorned beetle family Cerambycidae. It is found in Chile.
