= Allogaster unicolor =

Scientific classification
- Kingdom: Animalia
- Phylum: Arthropoda
- Class: Insecta
- Order: Coleoptera
- Suborder: Polyphaga
- Infraorder: Cucujiformia
- Family: Cerambycidae
- Subfamily: Cerambycinae
- Tribe: Achrysonini
- Genus: Allogaster
- Species: A. unicolor

Binomial name
- Allogaster unicolor Gahan, 1890

Species of beetle

Allogaster unicolor is a species in the longhorned beetle family Cerambycidae. It is found in Namibia, Zimbabwe, Zambia, Tanzania, and South Africa.
