= Achryson maculipenne =

Scientific classification
- Kingdom: Animalia
- Phylum: Arthropoda
- Class: Insecta
- Order: Coleoptera
- Suborder: Polyphaga
- Infraorder: Cucujiformia
- Family: Cerambycidae
- Subfamily: Cerambycinae
- Tribe: Achrysonini
- Genus: Achryson
- Species: A. maculipenne

Binomial name
- Achryson maculipenne (Lacordaire, 1963)

Synonyms
- Achryson setosum Martins, 1976; Acryson maculipenne Di Iorio, 2004; Trichomallus aculipennis Monné & Giesbert, 1994; Trichomallus maculipennis Zajciw, 1963; Trichomalus maculipennis Zischka, 1948

Species of beetle

Achryson maculipenne is a species in the longhorned beetle family Cerambycidae. It is found in Brazil, Bolivia, Argentina, and Paraguay.
