= A. maculatum =

A. maculatum may refer to:

== Plantae ==
- Arum maculatum, a common woodland plant species widespread across temperate northern Europe
- Anisophyllum maculatum, an annual, a plant native to North America, and invasive worldwide

== Animalia ==
- Armadillidium maculatum, the "zebra pillbug", a species of woodlouse, a type of isopod crustacean
- Anorostoma maculatum, a fly species
- Anelaphus maculatum, a beetle species
- Ambystoma maculatum, the "spotted salamander", a species of amphibian found in Eastern North America
- Amblyomma maculatum, the "Gulf Coast tick"
- Achryson maculatum, a species of longhorn beetle found in South America

== See also ==
- Maculatum (spotted, patchy, mottled; having spots)
