= Cerdaia testacea =

Scientific classification
- Kingdom: Animalia
- Phylum: Arthropoda
- Class: Insecta
- Order: Coleoptera
- Suborder: Polyphaga
- Infraorder: Cucujiformia
- Family: Cerambycidae
- Subfamily: Cerambycinae
- Tribe: Achrysonini
- Genus: Cerdaia
- Species: C. testacea

Binomial name
- Cerdaia testacea (Cerda, 1980)

Synonyms
- Pehuenia testacea Martins, 2000

Species of beetle

Cerdaia testacea is a species in the longhorned beetle family Cerambycidae. It is found in Chile.
