= Cotyachryson inspergatus =

Scientific classification
- Kingdom: Animalia
- Phylum: Arthropoda
- Class: Insecta
- Order: Coleoptera
- Suborder: Polyphaga
- Infraorder: Cucujiformia
- Family: Cerambycidae
- Subfamily: Cerambycinae
- Tribe: Achrysonini
- Genus: Cotyachryson
- Species: C. inspergatus

Binomial name
- Cotyachryson inspergatus (Fairmaire & Germain, 1859)

Synonyms
- Grammicosum inspergatus Martins, 2000; Hesperophanes inspergata Blackwelder, 1946; Hesperophanes inspergatus Strauch, 1861; Hesperophanes obscura Blackwelder, 1946; Hesperophanes obscurus Porter, 1925

Species of beetle

Cotyachryson inspergatus is a species in the longhorned beetle family Cerambycidae, found in Chile.
