= Araespor longicollis =

Scientific classification
- Domain: Eukaryota
- Kingdom: Animalia
- Phylum: Arthropoda
- Class: Insecta
- Order: Coleoptera
- Suborder: Polyphaga
- Infraorder: Cucujiformia
- Family: Cerambycidae
- Subfamily: Cerambycinae
- Tribe: Achrysonini
- Genus: Araespor
- Species: A. longicollis

Binomial name
- Araespor longicollis Thomson, 1878

Synonyms
- Araesper longicollis Evenhuis & Ramsdale, 2006; Ceresium angustulum Fairmaire, 1881

Species of beetle

Araespor longicollis is a species in the longhorned beetle family Cerambycidae. It is found in Cuba and Fiji.
