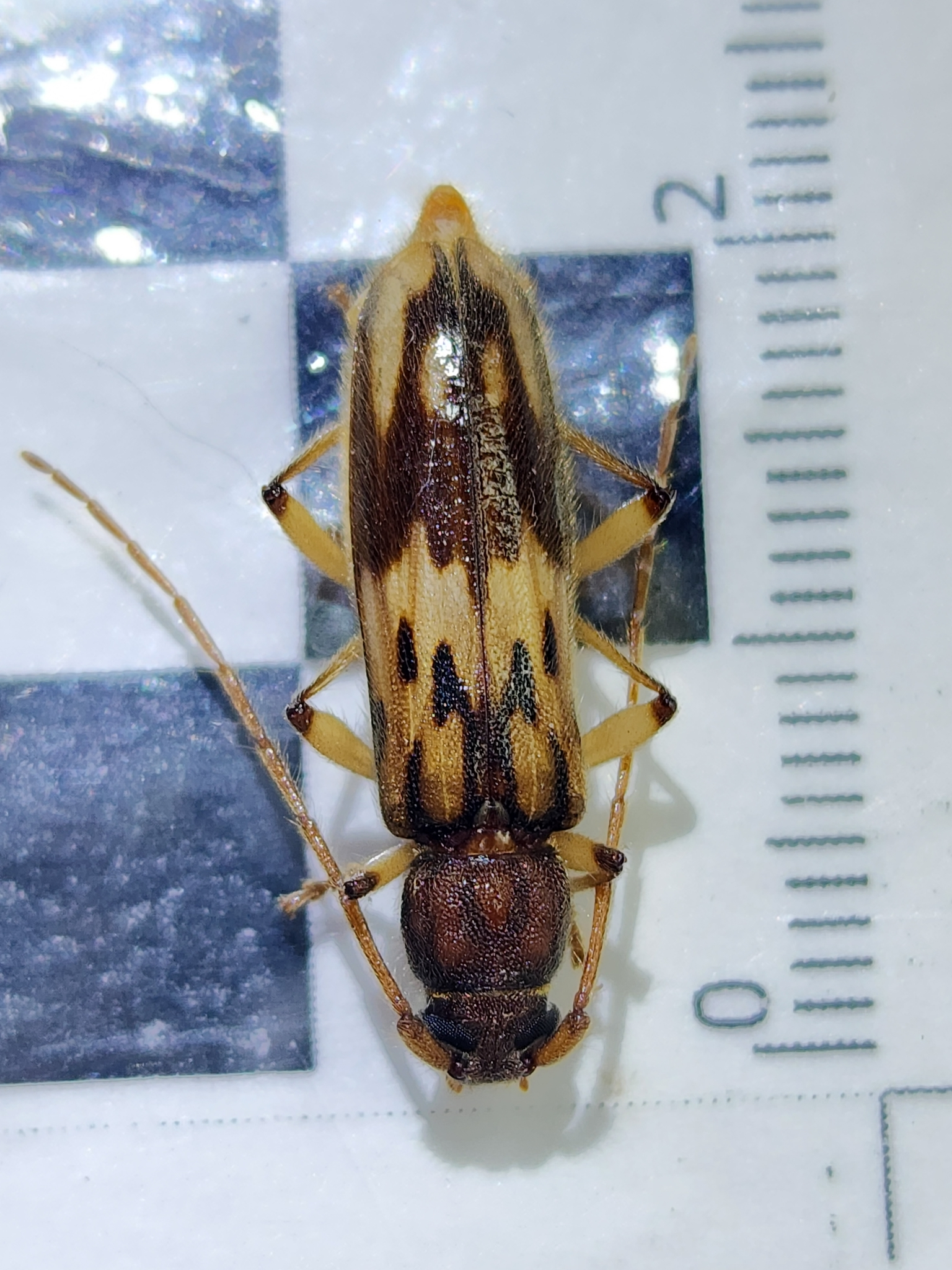
- Achryson lutarium, Argentina

Scientific classification
- Kingdom: Animalia
- Phylum: Arthropoda
- Class: Insecta
- Order: Coleoptera
- Suborder: Polyphaga
- Infraorder: Cucujiformia
- Family: Cerambycidae
- Subfamily: Cerambycinae
- Tribe: Achrysonini
- Genus: Achryson
- Species: A. lutarium

Binomial name
- Achryson lutarium Burmeister, 1865

Synonyms
- Achryson lineolatum lutarium Tippmann, 1960; Achryson lineolatum nigricans Lingafelter et al., 2014

= Achryson lutarium =

Species of beetle

Achryson lutarium is a species in the longhorned beetle family Cerambycidae. It is found in Paraguay, Uruguay, Bolivia, Argentina, and Brazil.

This species was described by Hermann Burmeister in 1865.
