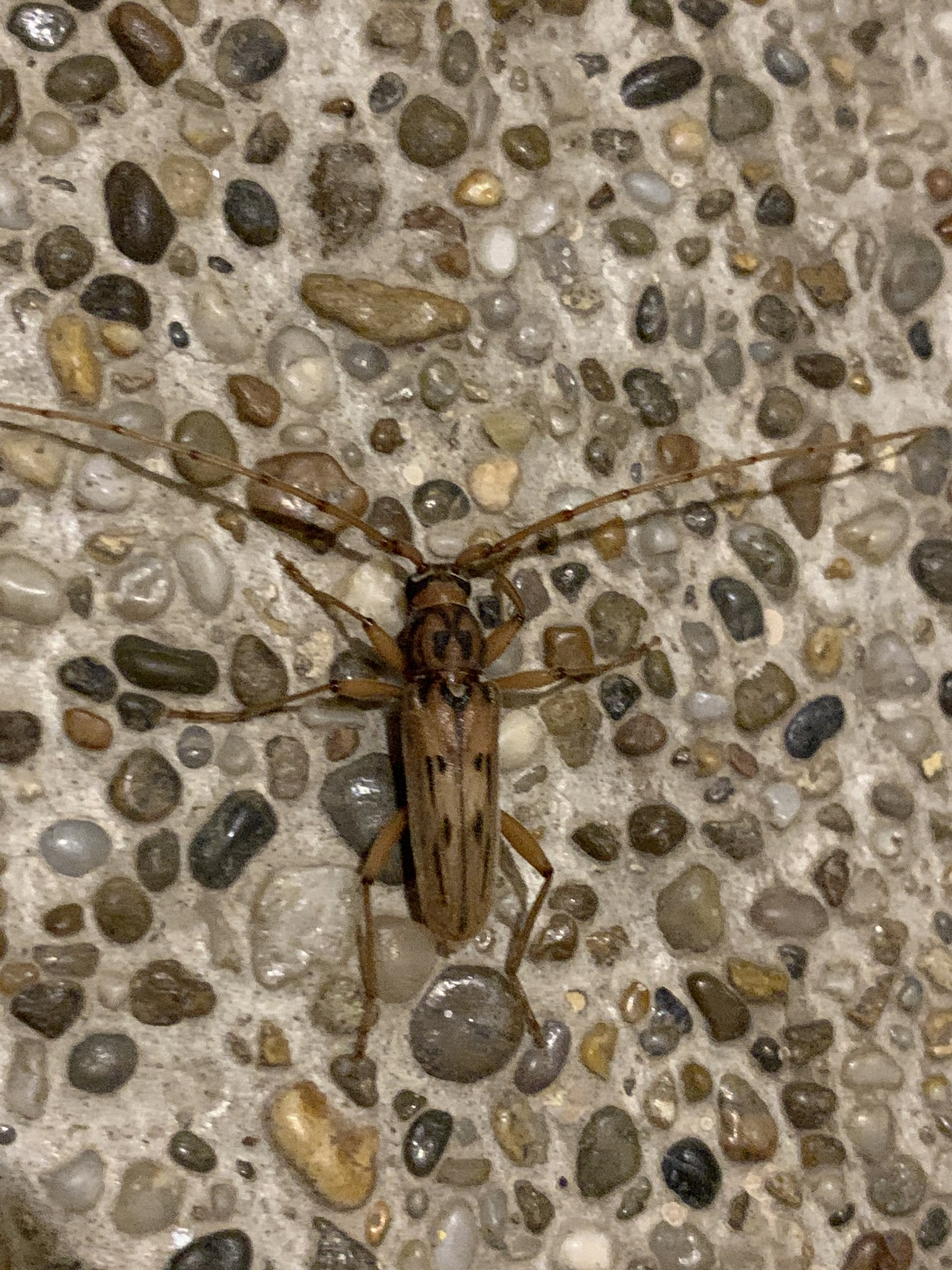
- Achryson lineolatum, Ecuador

Scientific classification
- Kingdom: Animalia
- Phylum: Arthropoda
- Class: Insecta
- Order: Coleoptera
- Suborder: Polyphaga
- Infraorder: Cucujiformia
- Family: Cerambycidae
- Subfamily: Cerambycinae
- Tribe: Achrysonini
- Genus: Achryson
- Species: A. lineolatum

Binomial name
- Achryson lineolatum Erichson, 1847

Synonyms
- Achryson galapagoense Monné, 1972; Achryson galapagoensis Linsley & Chemsak, 1966; Achryson lineolatum andinum Tippmann, 1960; Achryson scutellatum Kirsch, 1889

= Achryson lineolatum =

Species of beetle

Achryson lineolatum is a species in the longhorned beetle family Cerambycidae. It is known from Bolivia, Chile, Ecuador, Peru, Venezuela, and the Galapagos Islands.

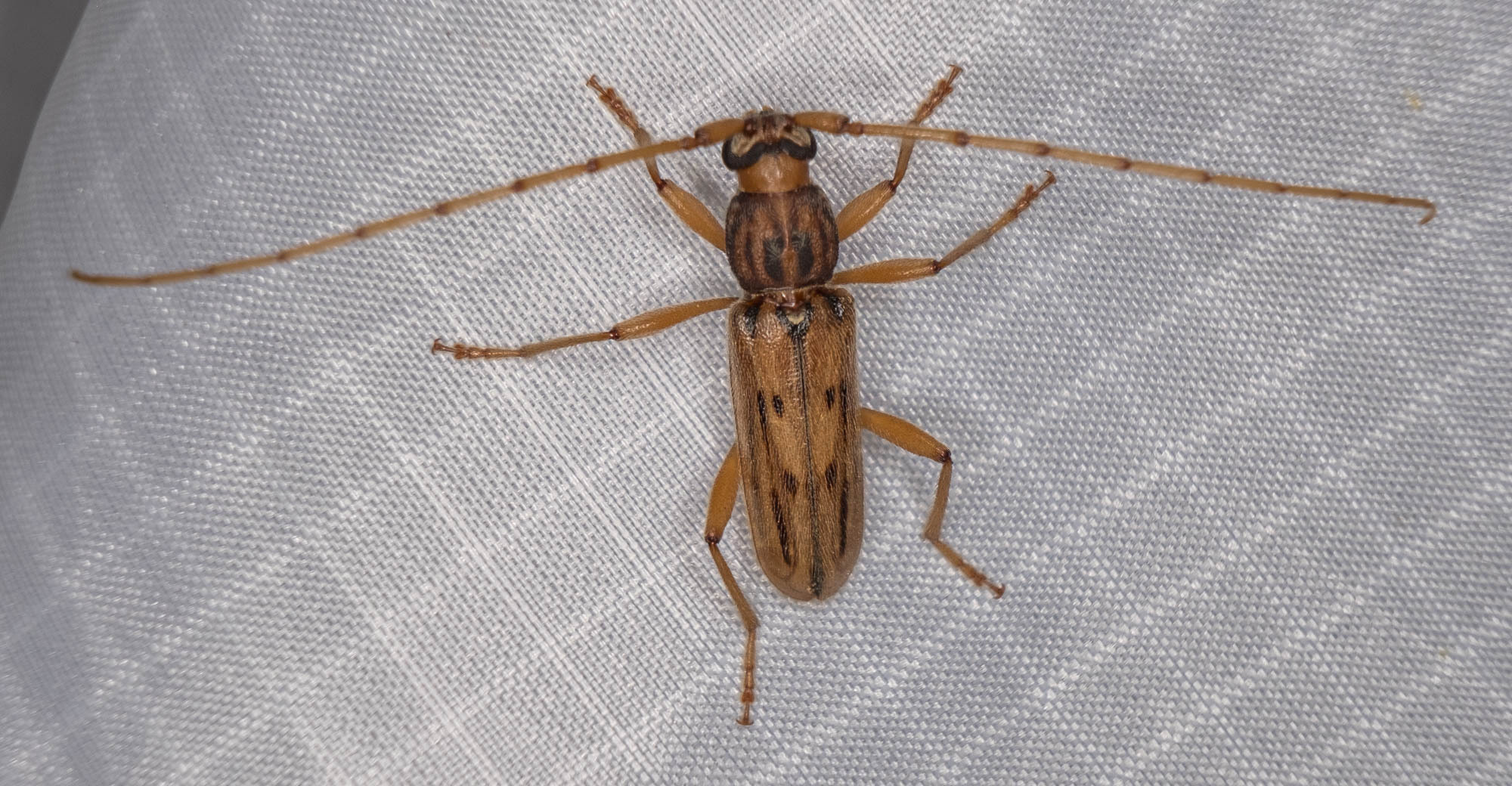
Achryson lineolatum, Ecuador
