= Huequenia livida =

Scientific classification
- Kingdom: Animalia
- Phylum: Arthropoda
- Class: Insecta
- Order: Coleoptera
- Suborder: Polyphaga
- Infraorder: Cucujiformia
- Family: Cerambycidae
- Subfamily: Cerambycinae
- Tribe: Achrysonini
- Genus: Huequenia
- Species: H. livida

Binomial name
- Huequenia livida (Germain, 1898)

Synonyms
- Angolia livida Cerda, 1980; Compsa livida Blackwelder, 1946; Xenocompsa livida Martins, 1965

Species of beetle

Huequenia livida is a species in the longhorned beetle family Cerambycidae. It is found in Argentina and Chile.
