= Allogaster drumonti =

Scientific classification
- Kingdom: Animalia
- Phylum: Arthropoda
- Class: Insecta
- Order: Coleoptera
- Suborder: Polyphaga
- Infraorder: Cucujiformia
- Family: Cerambycidae
- Subfamily: Cerambycinae
- Tribe: Achrysonini
- Genus: Allogaster
- Species: A. drumonti

Binomial name
- Allogaster drumonti Adlbauer, 2010

Species of insect

Allogaster drumonti is a species in the longhorned beetle family Cerambycidae, found in the Democratic Republic of the Congo.
