= Achryson philippii =

Scientific classification
- Kingdom: Animalia
- Phylum: Arthropoda
- Class: Insecta
- Order: Coleoptera
- Suborder: Polyphaga
- Infraorder: Cucujiformia
- Family: Cerambycidae
- Subfamily: Cerambycinae
- Tribe: Achrysonini
- Genus: Achryson
- Species: A. philippii

Binomial name
- Achryson philippii Germain, 1898

Synonyms
- Achryson philippi Cerda, 1987

Species of beetle

Achryson philippii is a species in the longhorned beetle family Cerambycidae. It is found in Chile.
