= Cotyachryson sulcicorne =

Scientific classification
- Kingdom: Animalia
- Phylum: Arthropoda
- Class: Insecta
- Order: Coleoptera
- Suborder: Polyphaga
- Infraorder: Cucujiformia
- Family: Cerambycidae
- Subfamily: Cerambycinae
- Tribe: Achrysonini
- Genus: Cotyachryson
- Species: C. sulcicorne

Binomial name
- Cotyachryson sulcicorne (Germain, 1898)

Synonyms
- Hesperophanes sulcicornis Zajciw, 1959

Species of beetle

Cotyachryson sulcicorne is a species in the longhorned beetle family Cerambycidae. It is found in Chile.
