= Enosmaeus =

Scientific classification
- Kingdom: Animalia
- Phylum: Arthropoda
- Class: Insecta
- Order: Coleoptera
- Suborder: Polyphaga
- Infraorder: Cucujiformia
- Family: Cerambycidae
- Tribe: Achrysonini
- Genus: Enosmaeus; Thomson, 1878
- Species: E. cubanus

Binomial name
- Enosmaeus cubanus Thomson, 1878

Synonyms
- Pseudoeme Fisher, 1932

Genus of insects

Enosmaeus is a genus in the longhorn beetle family Cerambycidae. This genus has a single species, Enosmaeus cubanus. It is found in Cuba, Haiti, and Puerto Rico.
