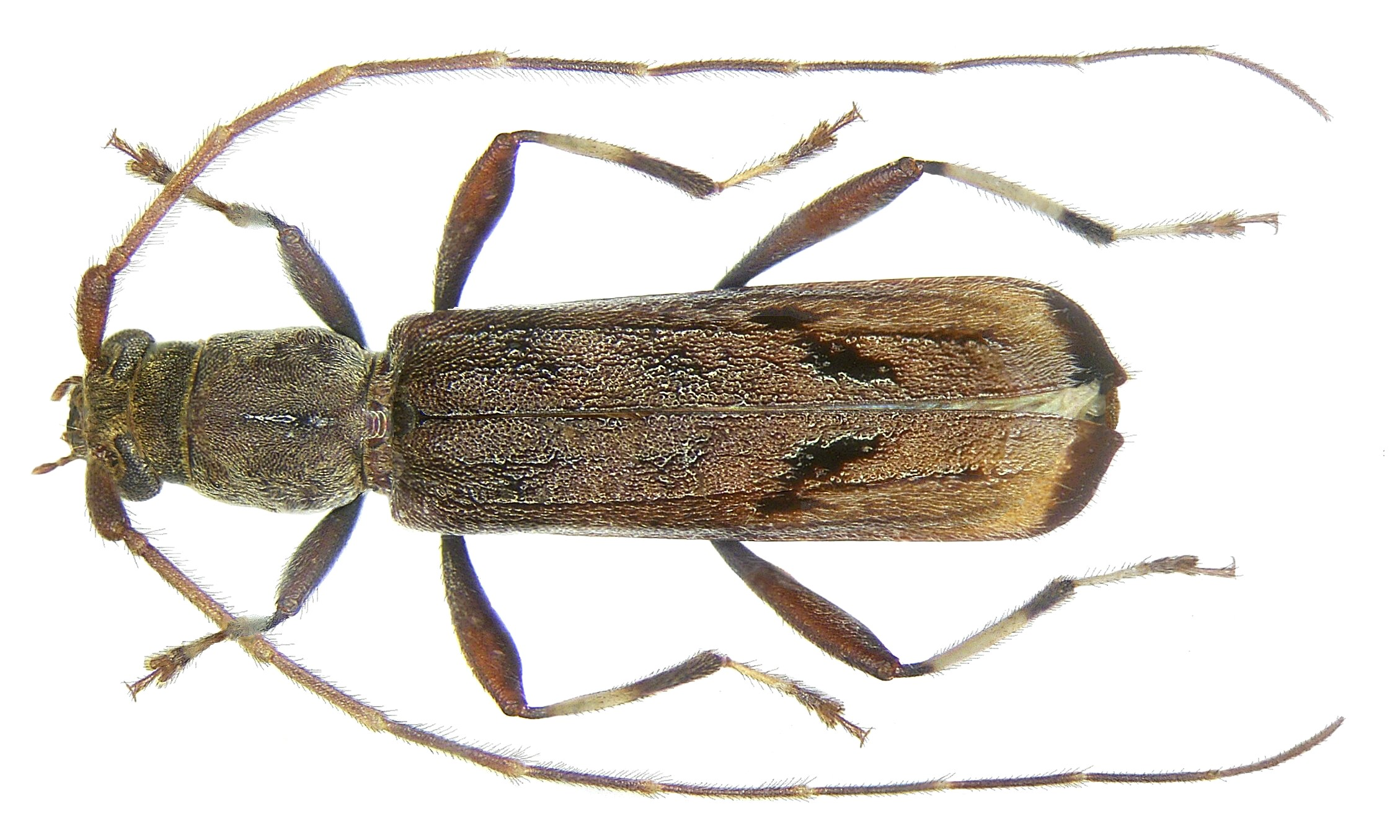
- Araespor callosus

Scientific classification
- Kingdom: Animalia
- Phylum: Arthropoda
- Class: Insecta
- Order: Coleoptera
- Suborder: Polyphaga
- Infraorder: Cucujiformia
- Family: Cerambycidae
- Subfamily: Cerambycinae
- Tribe: Achrysonini
- Genus: Araespor; Thomson, 1878

= Araespor =

Genus of beetles

Araespor is a genus of Australasian longhorn beetles in the tribe Callidiopini, erected by Thomson in 1878.

== Species ==
These seven species belong to the genus Araespor:

- Araespor callosus Gressitt, 1959 (Papua New Guinea)
- Araespor darlingtoni Gressitt, 1959 (Papua New Guinea, Western New Guinea, and Indonesia)
- Araespor gazellus Gressitt, 1959 (Papua New Guinea and Solomon Islands)
- Araespor longicollis Thomson, 1878 (Cuba and Fiji)
- Araespor pallidus Gressitt, 1959 (Papua New Guinea)
- Araespor pictus (Fauvel, 1906) (New Caledonia)
- Araespor quinquepustulatus (Montrouzier, 1861) (New Caledonia and New Zealand)
