= Neoachryson =

Scientific classification
- Kingdom: Animalia
- Phylum: Arthropoda
- Class: Insecta
- Order: Coleoptera
- Suborder: Polyphaga
- Infraorder: Cucujiformia
- Family: Cerambycidae
- Tribe: Achrysonini
- Genus: Neoachryson; Monné & Monné, 2004
- Species: N. castaneum

Binomial name
- Neoachryson castaneum Monné M. L. & Monné M. A., 2004

Genus of insects

Neoachryson is a genus in the longhorn beetle family Cerambycidae. This genus has a single species, Neoachryson castaneum. It is found in Argentina.
