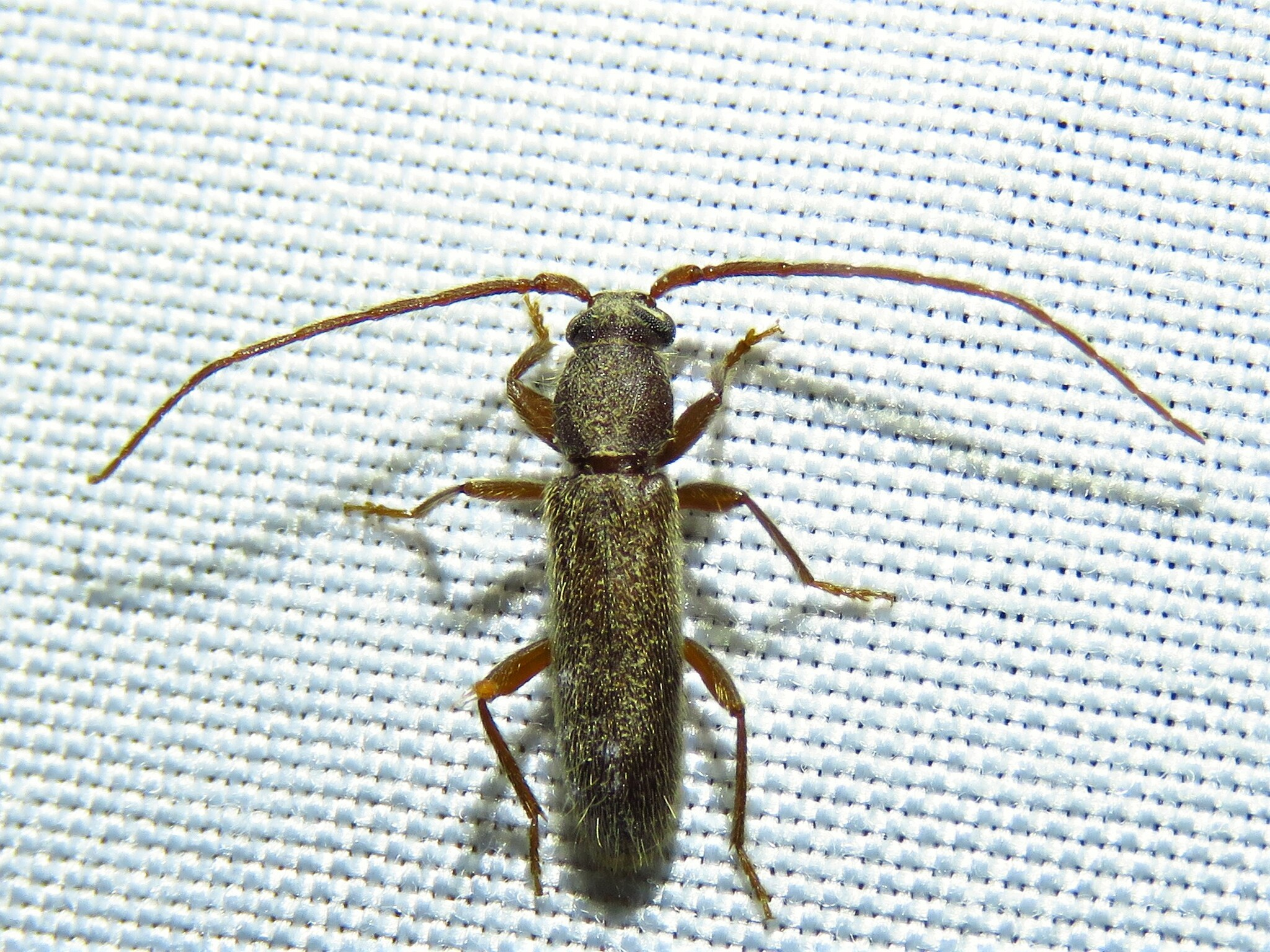
- Geropa concolor, Texas

Scientific classification
- Kingdom: Animalia
- Phylum: Arthropoda
- Class: Insecta
- Order: Coleoptera
- Suborder: Polyphaga
- Infraorder: Cucujiformia
- Family: Cerambycidae
- Tribe: Achrysonini
- Genus: Geropa; Casey, 1912
- Species: G. concolor

Binomial name
- Geropa concolor (LeConte, 1873)

= Geropa =

Genus of insects

Geropa is a genus in the longhorn beetle family Cerambycidae. This genus has a single species, Geropa concolor. It is found in Mexico and the United States.
