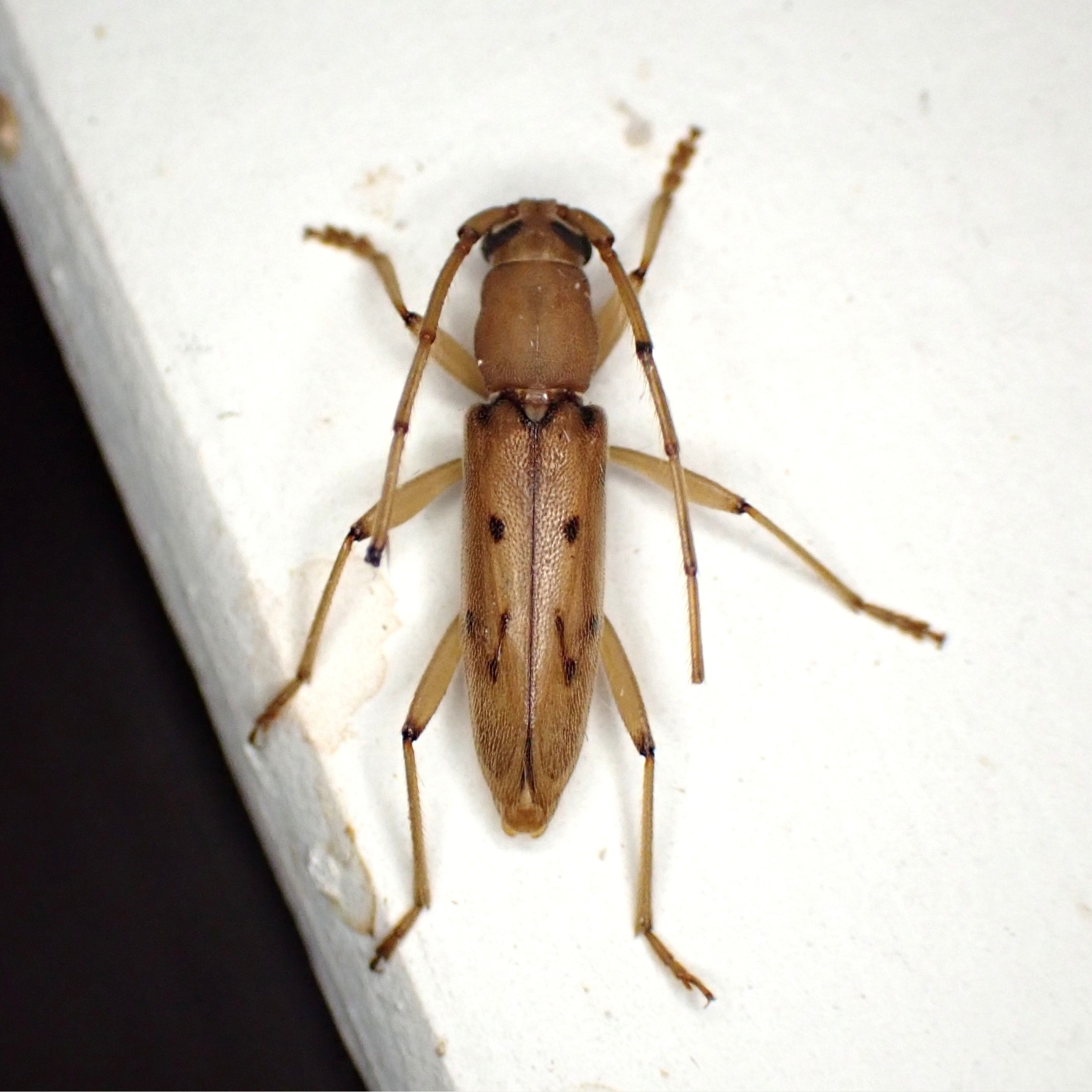
- Achryson surinamum, Bolivia

Scientific classification
- Kingdom: Animalia
- Phylum: Arthropoda
- Class: Insecta
- Order: Coleoptera
- Suborder: Polyphaga
- Infraorder: Cucujiformia
- Family: Cerambycidae
- Genus: Achryson
- Species: A. surinamum

Binomial name
- Achryson surinamum (Linnaeus, 1767)

Synonyms
- Cerambyx surinamus Linnaeus, 1767; Cerambyx longicollis Degeer, 1775; Cerambyx simplex Voet, 1781 (Unav.); Cerambyx biangulatus Voet, 1781 (Unav.); Stenocorus circumflexus Fabricius, 1787; Stenocorus pallens Fabricius, 1792; Cerambyx surinamensis Olivier, 1795 (Missp.); Achryson surinamum var. chontalense Bates, 1872; Achryson surinam Leng, 1885 (Missp.)

= Achryson surinamum =

Species of beetle

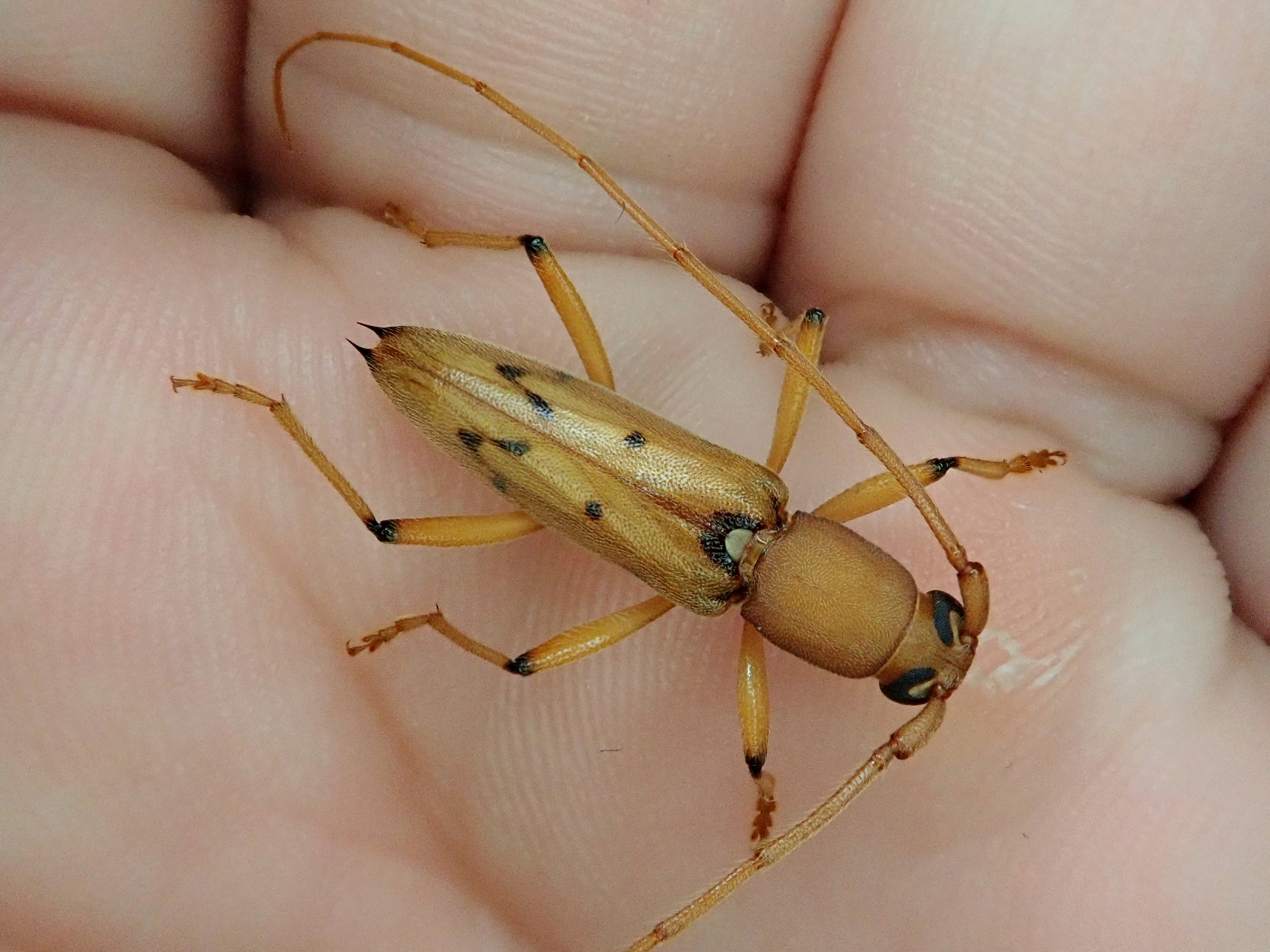
Achryson surinamum, Brazil

Achryson surinamum is a species of longhorn beetle in the subfamily Cerambycinae. It was described by Carl Linnaeus in his 1767 12th edition of Systema Naturae. It is known from the United States to Chile.
