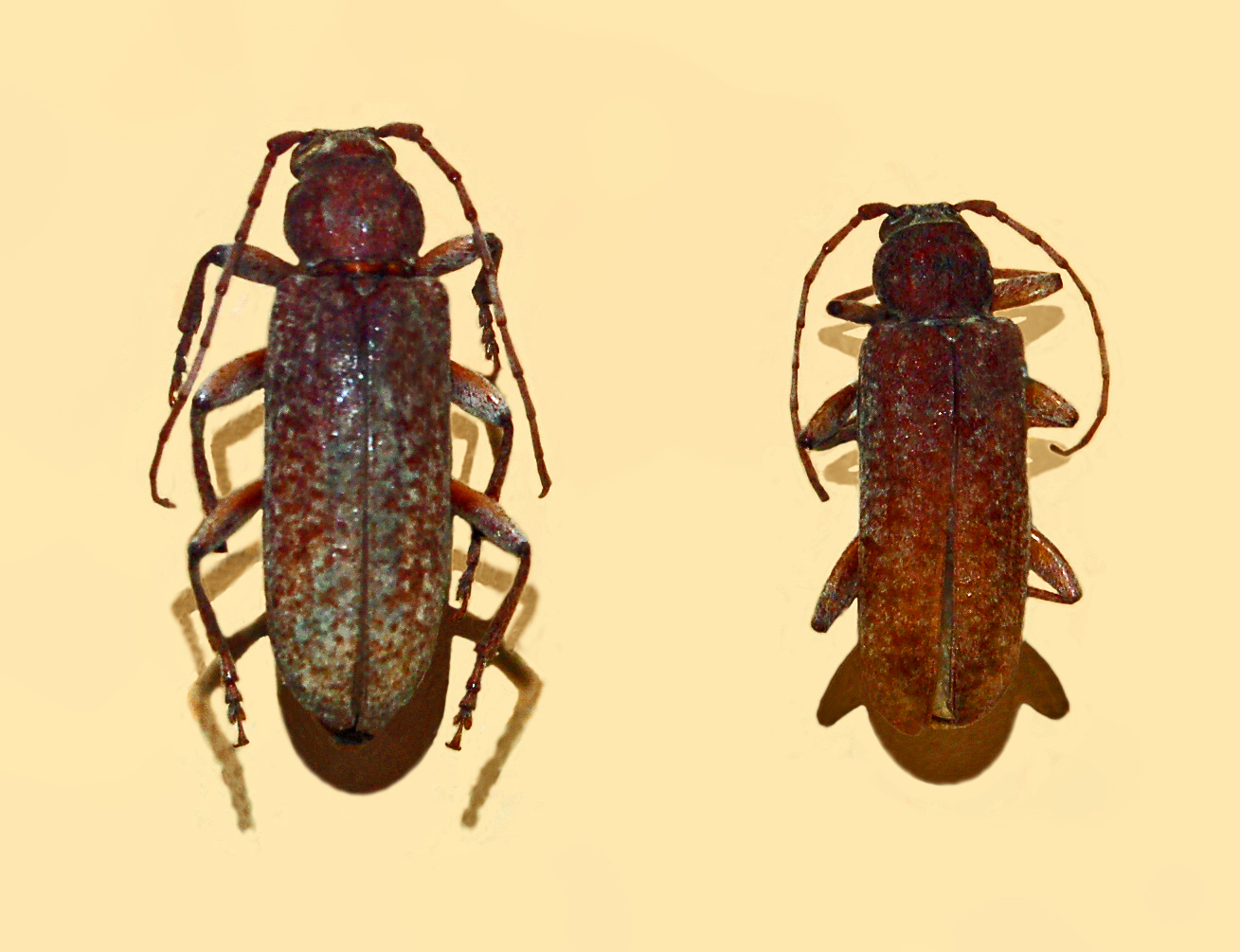
- Cotyachryson philippii from Chile, male and female. Mounted specimen

Scientific classification
- Domain: Eukaryota
- Kingdom: Animalia
- Phylum: Arthropoda
- Class: Insecta
- Order: Coleoptera
- Suborder: Polyphaga
- Infraorder: Cucujiformia
- Family: Cerambycidae
- Subfamily: Cerambycinae
- Tribe: Achrysonini
- Genus: Cotyachryson; Martins, 2002

= Cotyachryson =

Genus of insects

Cotyachryson is a genus in the longhorn beetle family Cerambycidae. There are at least three described species in Cotyachryson, found in Chile.

== Species ==
These three species belong to the genus Cotyachryson:

- Cotyachryson cinereus (Blanchard, 1851)
- Cotyachryson inspergatus (Fairmaire & Germain, 1859)
- Cotyachryson sulcicorne (Germain, 1898)
