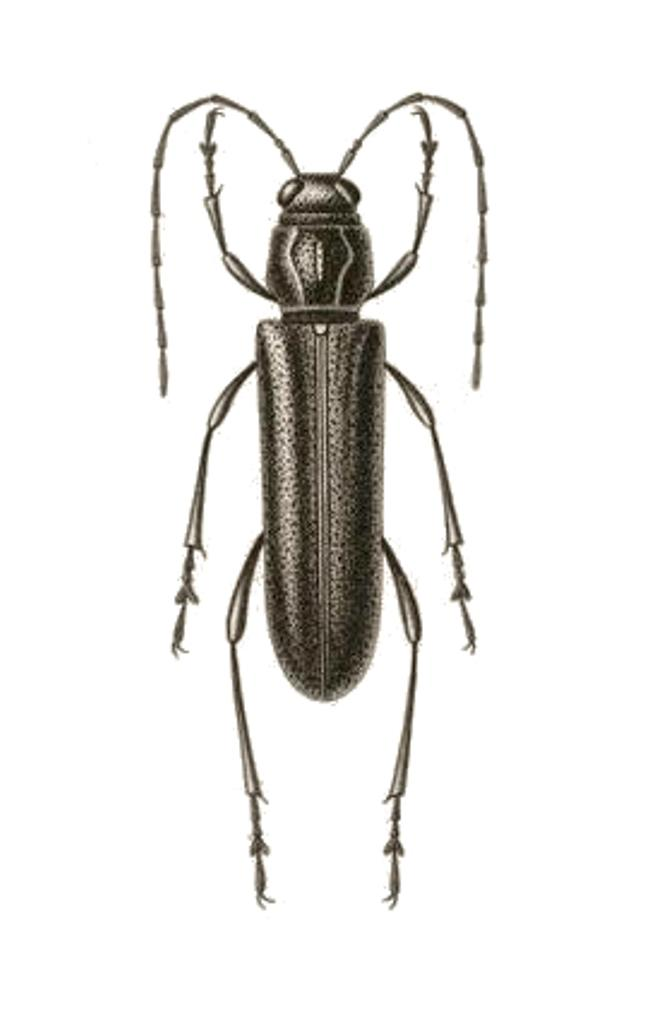

Scientific classification
- Kingdom: Animalia
- Phylum: Arthropoda
- Class: Insecta
- Order: Coleoptera
- Suborder: Polyphaga
- Infraorder: Cucujiformia
- Family: Cerambycidae
- Tribe: Achrysonini
- Genus: Abyarachryson; Martins, 2002
- Species: A. signaticolle

Binomial name
- Abyarachryson signaticolle (Blanchard, 1851)

= Abyarachryson =

Species of beetles

Abyarachryson is a genus in the longhorn beetle family Cerambycidae. This genus has a single species, Abyarachryson signaticolle, found in Chile.
