= Esseiachryson =

Scientific classification
- Kingdom: Animalia
- Phylum: Arthropoda
- Class: Insecta
- Order: Coleoptera
- Suborder: Polyphaga
- Infraorder: Cucujiformia
- Family: Cerambycidae
- Tribe: Achrysonini
- Genus: Esseiachryson; Martins, 2002
- Species: E. minutum

Binomial name
- Esseiachryson minutum (Blanchard, 1851)

Genus of insects

Esseiachryson is a genus in the longhorn beetle family Cerambycidae. This genus has a single species, Esseiachryson minutum. It is found in Chile.
