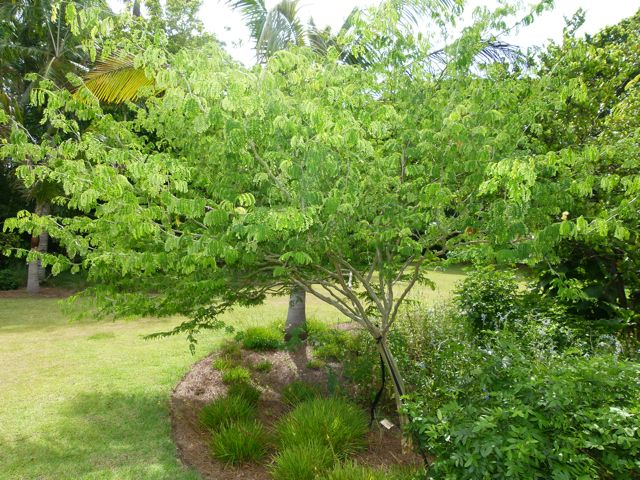

Conservation status
- Near Threatened (IUCN 3.1)

Scientific classification
- Kingdom: Plantae
- Clade: Tracheophytes
- Clade: Angiosperms
- Clade: Eudicots
- Clade: Rosids
- Order: Fabales
- Family: Fabaceae
- Subfamily: Caesalpinioideae
- Clade: Mimosoid clade
- Genus: Chloroleucon
- Species: C. tortum

Binomial name
- Chloroleucon tortum (Mart.) Pittier

Synonyms
- Cathormion tortum (Mart.) Pittier; Feuilleea torta (Mart.) Kuntze; Inga torta Mart. ex Colla; Pithecellobium tortum Mart. (1837); Pithecellobium tortum var. pubescens Benth.; Pithecellobium tortum f. scalare Hassl.

= Chloroleucon tortum =

Species of legume

Chloroleucon tortum is a species of flowering plant in the family Fabaceae. It is a shrub or tree native to Brazil and Curaçao.

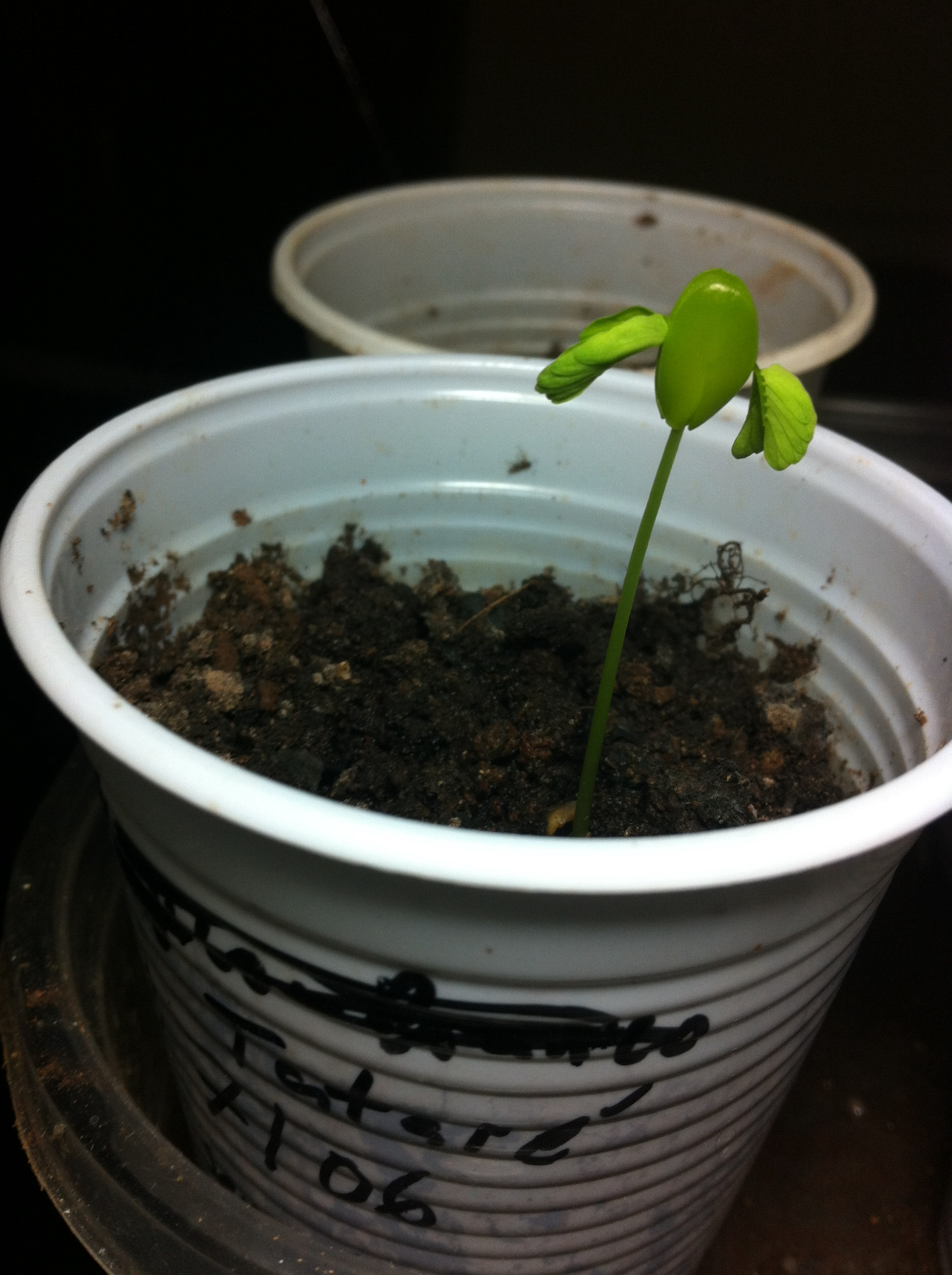
Chloroleucon tortum, a native species to Brazilian restinga. Also known as tataré or Brazilian rain tree. This specimen is a week old (from seeding) and was collected at Ibirapuera Park in São Paulo (-23.587278, -46.656260), Brazil in June, 2014.

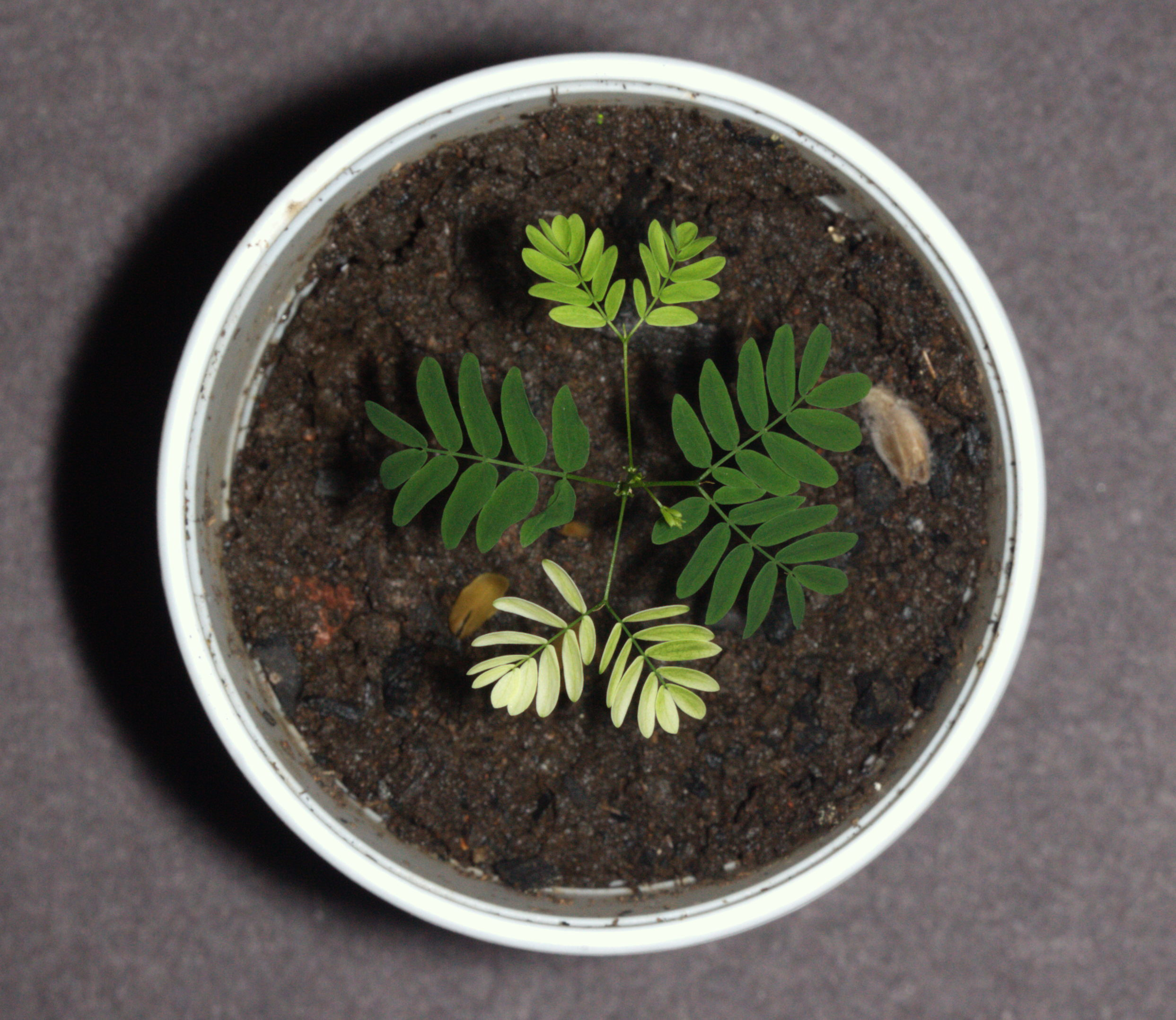
Chloroleucon tortum, a native species to Brazilian restinga. Also known as tataré or Brazilian rain tree. This specimen is three weeks old (from seeding) and was collected at Ibirapuera Park in São Paulo.
