= Huequenia =

Scientific classification
- Domain: Eukaryota
- Kingdom: Animalia
- Phylum: Arthropoda
- Class: Insecta
- Order: Coleoptera
- Suborder: Polyphaga
- Infraorder: Cucujiformia
- Family: Cerambycidae
- Subfamily: Cerambycinae
- Tribe: Achrysonini
- Genus: Huequenia; Cerda, 1986

Synonyms
- Angolia Cerda Gonzalez, 1980

Genus of insects

Huequenia is a genus in the longhorn beetle family Cerambycidae. There are at least two described species in Huequenia.

== Species ==
These two species belong to the genus Huequenia:

- Huequenia araucana (Cerda, 1980) (Chile)
- Huequenia livida (Germain, 1898) (Argentina and Chile)
