= Drascalia =

Scientific classification
- Kingdom: Animalia
- Phylum: Arthropoda
- Clade: Pancrustacea
- Class: Insecta
- Order: Coleoptera
- Suborder: Polyphaga
- Infraorder: Cucujiformia
- Family: Cerambycidae
- Tribe: Achrysonini
- Genus: Drascalia; Fairmaire & Germain, 1864
- Species: D. praelonga

Binomial name
- Drascalia praelonga Fairmaire & Germain, 1864

Synonyms
- Acanthachryson Bruch, 1921

Genus of insects

Drascalia is a genus in the longhorn beetle family Cerambycidae. This genus has a single species, Drascalia praelonga. It is found in Chile and Argentina.
