= Chloroleucon foliolosum =

Scientific classification
- Kingdom: Plantae
- Clade: Tracheophytes
- Clade: Angiosperms
- Clade: Eudicots
- Clade: Rosids
- Order: Fabales
- Family: Fabaceae
- Subfamily: Caesalpinioideae
- Clade: Mimosoid clade
- Genus: Chloroleucon
- Species: C. foliolosum

Binomial name
- Chloroleucon foliolosum (Benth.) G.P.Lewis

Synonyms
- Numerous, see text

Species of legume

Chloroleucon foliolosum is a tree species in the legume family (Fabaceae). It is found in Argentina, Brazil and Bolivia.

Junior synonyms are:

- Calliandra aristulata Rizzini
- Calliandra grisebachianum (Benth.) Speg.
- Feuilleea bahiensis Kuntze
- Pithecellobium foliolosum Benth.
- Pithecellobium grisebachianum Harms
- Pithecellobium myriophyllum Malme

Pithecellobium myriophyllum Gagnep. is a synonym of Albizia lebbekoides

- Pithecellobium oligandrum Rizzini
- Pithecolobium foliolosum Benth. (lapsus)
