= Cerdaia =

Scientific classification
- Domain: Eukaryota
- Kingdom: Animalia
- Phylum: Arthropoda
- Class: Insecta
- Order: Coleoptera
- Suborder: Polyphaga
- Infraorder: Cucujiformia
- Family: Cerambycidae
- Subfamily: Cerambycinae
- Tribe: Achrysonini
- Genus: Cerdaia; Monné, 2006

Synonyms
- Pehuenia Cerda Gonzalez, 1980

Genus of insects

Cerdaia is a genus in the longhorn beetle family Cerambycidae. There are at least two described species in Cerdaia, found in Chile.

== Species ==
These two species belong to the genus Cerdaia:

- Cerdaia lunata (Germain, 1898)
- Cerdaia testacea (Cerda, 1980)
