= Achryson quadrimaculatum =

Scientific classification
- Kingdom: Animalia
- Phylum: Arthropoda
- Class: Insecta
- Order: Coleoptera
- Suborder: Polyphaga
- Infraorder: Cucujiformia
- Family: Cerambycidae
- Genus: Achryson
- Species: A. quadrimaculatum

Binomial name
- Achryson quadrimaculatum (Fabricius, 1792)

Synonyms
- Achryson griseopubescens Monné 1972; Achryson hirsutulum Bates 1870; Achryson kartaboensis Fisher 1944; Achryson ornatipenne Perroud 1855

Species of beetle

Achryson quadrimaculatum is a species of longhorn beetle in the Cerambycinae subfamily. It was described by Johan Christian Fabricius in 1792. It is known from Costa Rica, Guadeloupe, Trinidad, Guyana, Aruba, Brazil, Argentina, and Venezuela.
