= Achryson chacoense =

Scientific classification
- Kingdom: Animalia
- Phylum: Arthropoda
- Class: Insecta
- Order: Coleoptera
- Suborder: Polyphaga
- Infraorder: Cucujiformia
- Family: Cerambycidae
- Subfamily: Cerambycinae
- Tribe: Achrysonini
- Genus: Achryson
- Species: A. chacoense

Binomial name
- Achryson chacoense Di Iorio, 2003

Species of beetle

Achryson chacoense is a species in the longhorned beetle family Cerambycidae. It is found in Argentina.
