= Allogaster =

Scientific classification
- Kingdom: Animalia
- Phylum: Arthropoda
- Class: Insecta
- Order: Coleoptera
- Suborder: Polyphaga
- Infraorder: Cucujiformia
- Family: Cerambycidae
- Subfamily: Cerambycinae
- Tribe: Achrysonini
- Genus: Allogaster; Thomson, 1864

Genus of beetles

Allogaster is a genus of beetles in the longhorn beetle family. Its first appearance was believed to be around 125.45 million years ago. They are mainly found in sub-Saharan Africa.

These beetles tend to be medium-sized, with gray or brown wooden bucks and long antennae. The antennae tends to be longer than the body.

== Species ==
These eight species belong to the genus Allogaster:

- Allogaster aethiopicus Adlbauer, 1999 (Eritrea, Ethiopia)
- Allogaster bicolor Duffy, 1952 (DR Congo)
- Allogaster drumonti Adlbauer, 2010 (DR Congo)
- Allogaster geniculatus Thomson, 1864 (sub-Saharan Africa)
- Allogaster inarmatus Adlbauer, 2019 (Mozambique)
- Allogaster niger Jordan, 1894 (Nigeria)
- Allogaster nigripennis Aurivillius, 1915 (Sudan)
- Allogaster unicolor Gahan, 1890 (Namibia, Zimbabwe, Zambia, Tanzania, and South Africa)
