= Crotchiella =

Conservation status
- Endangered (IUCN 3.1)

Scientific classification
- Kingdom: Animalia
- Phylum: Arthropoda
- Class: Insecta
- Order: Coleoptera
- Suborder: Polyphaga
- Infraorder: Cucujiformia
- Family: Cerambycidae
- Subfamily: Cerambycinae
- Tribe: Achrysonini
- Genus: Crotchiella; Israelson, 1985
- Species: C. brachyptera

Binomial name
- Crotchiella brachyptera Israelson, 1985

Genus of beetles

Crotchiella is a genus of longhorn beetles containing only one species, Crotchiella brachyptera, an endangered species endemic to the Azores.

== Distribution and habitat ==
C. brachyptera is known only from the islands of Pico, Saõ Miguel, and Santa Maria in the Azores archipelago. It inhabits montane laurel forests, where it can be found living in the dead wood of Laurus azorica, Vitis vinifera, and Ilex species.
