= Achryson pictum =

Scientific classification
- Kingdom: Animalia
- Phylum: Arthropoda
- Class: Insecta
- Order: Coleoptera
- Suborder: Polyphaga
- Infraorder: Cucujiformia
- Family: Cerambycidae
- Genus: Achryson
- Species: A. pictum

Binomial name
- Achryson pictum Bates, 1870

Species of beetle

Achryson pictum is a species of longhorn beetle in the Cerambycinae subfamily. It was described by Henry Walter Bates in 1870. It is known from French Guiana, northwestern Brazil, Ecuador, and Bolivia.
