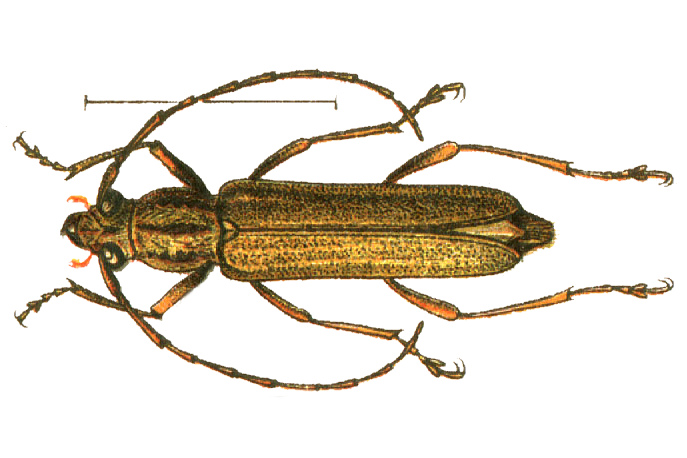

Scientific classification
- Domain: Eukaryota
- Kingdom: Animalia
- Phylum: Arthropoda
- Class: Insecta
- Order: Coleoptera
- Suborder: Polyphaga
- Infraorder: Cucujiformia
- Family: Cerambycidae
- Subfamily: Cerambycinae
- Tribe: Achrysonini
- Genus: Icosium; Lucas, 1854
- Species: I. tomentosum

Binomial name
- Icosium tomentosum Lucas, 1854

= Icosium tomentosum =

Species of beetle

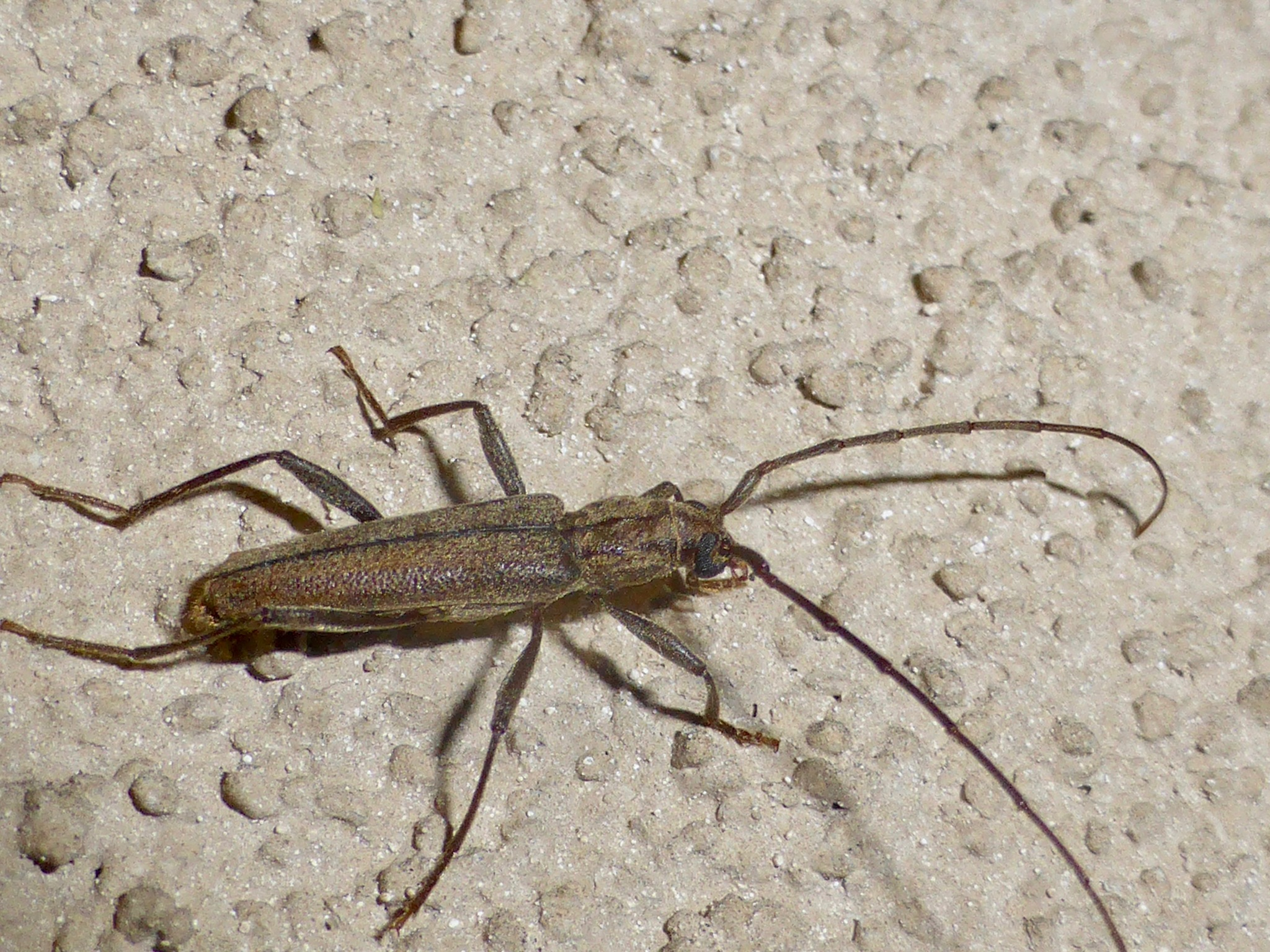
Icosium tomentosum, California

Icosium tomentosum is a species of beetle in the family Cerambycidae, the only species in the genus Icosium. It is native to the Mediterranean, but has been introduced to California.
