= Allogaster nigripennis =

Scientific classification
- Kingdom: Animalia
- Phylum: Arthropoda
- Class: Insecta
- Order: Coleoptera
- Suborder: Polyphaga
- Infraorder: Cucujiformia
- Family: Cerambycidae
- Genus: Allogaster
- Species: A. nigripennis

Binomial name
- Allogaster nigripennis Aurivillius, 1915

Species of beetle

Allogaster nigripennis is a species of beetle in the longhorn beetle family native to Sudan.

Their larvae are known to drill into wood and cause damage to the live trees, or may burrow into trees that have been felled.
