= Aquinillum =

Scientific classification
- Kingdom: Animalia
- Phylum: Arthropoda
- Class: Insecta
- Order: Coleoptera
- Suborder: Polyphaga
- Infraorder: Cucujiformia
- Family: Cerambycidae
- Subfamily: Cerambycinae
- Tribe: Achrysonini
- Genus: Aquinillum; Thomson, 1878
- Species: A. pallidum

Binomial name
- Aquinillum pallidum Thomson, 1878

Genus of beetles

Aquinillum is a genus in the family of Cerambycidae and tribe of Achrysonini. It contains a single species, Aquinillum pallidum, found on Fiji and Samoa.
