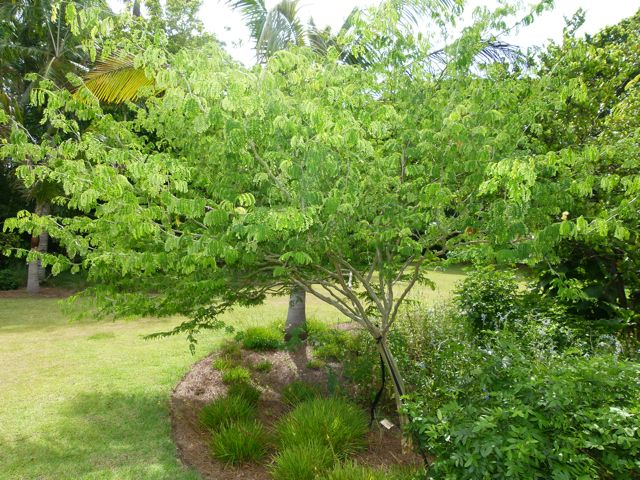
- Chloroleucon tortum

Scientific classification
- Kingdom: Plantae
- Clade: Tracheophytes
- Clade: Angiosperms
- Clade: Eudicots
- Clade: Rosids
- Order: Fabales
- Family: Fabaceae
- Subfamily: Caesalpinioideae
- Clade: Mimosoid clade
- Genus: Chloroleucon (Benth.) Record (1927)

Type species
- Chloroleucon vincentis (Benth.) Britton & Rose

Species
- 11; see text

Synonyms
- Chloroleucum Britton & Rose ex Record; Pithecellobium sect. Chloroleucon Benth.

= Chloroleucon =

Genus of legumes

Chloroleucon is a genus of flowering plants in the family Fabaceae. It contains 11 species native to the tropical Americas, ranging from Mexico through Central America, the Caribbean, and South America to northern Argentina. Some authorities consider it part of the genus Albizia. Its name is derived from the Greek words χλωρóς (chloros), meaning "green," and λευκός (leukos), meaning "white."

== Species ==
11 species are currently accepted:

- Chloroleucon acacioides (Ducke) Barneby & J.W.Grimes
- Chloroleucon chacoense (Burkart) Barneby & J.W.Grimes – Palo Barroso (Argentina, Paraguay, Bolivia)
- Chloroleucon dumosum (Benth.) G.P.Lewis
- Chloroleucon eurycyclum Barneby & J.W.Grimes (Venezuela)
- Chloroleucon extortum Barneby & J.W.Grimes (Brazil)
- Chloroleucon foliolosum (Benth.) G.P.Lewis
- Chloroleucon guantanamense (Britton) Britton & Rose
- Chloroleucon mangense (Jacq.) Britton & Rose
- Chloroleucon sempervivum Silverst.
- Chloroleucon tenuiflorum (Benth.) Barneby & J.W.Grimes
- Chloroleucon tortum (Mart.) Pittier (Brazil)

=== Formerly placed here ===
- Ebenopsis ebano (Berland.) Barneby & J.W.Grimes (as C. ebano (Berland.) L.Rico)
