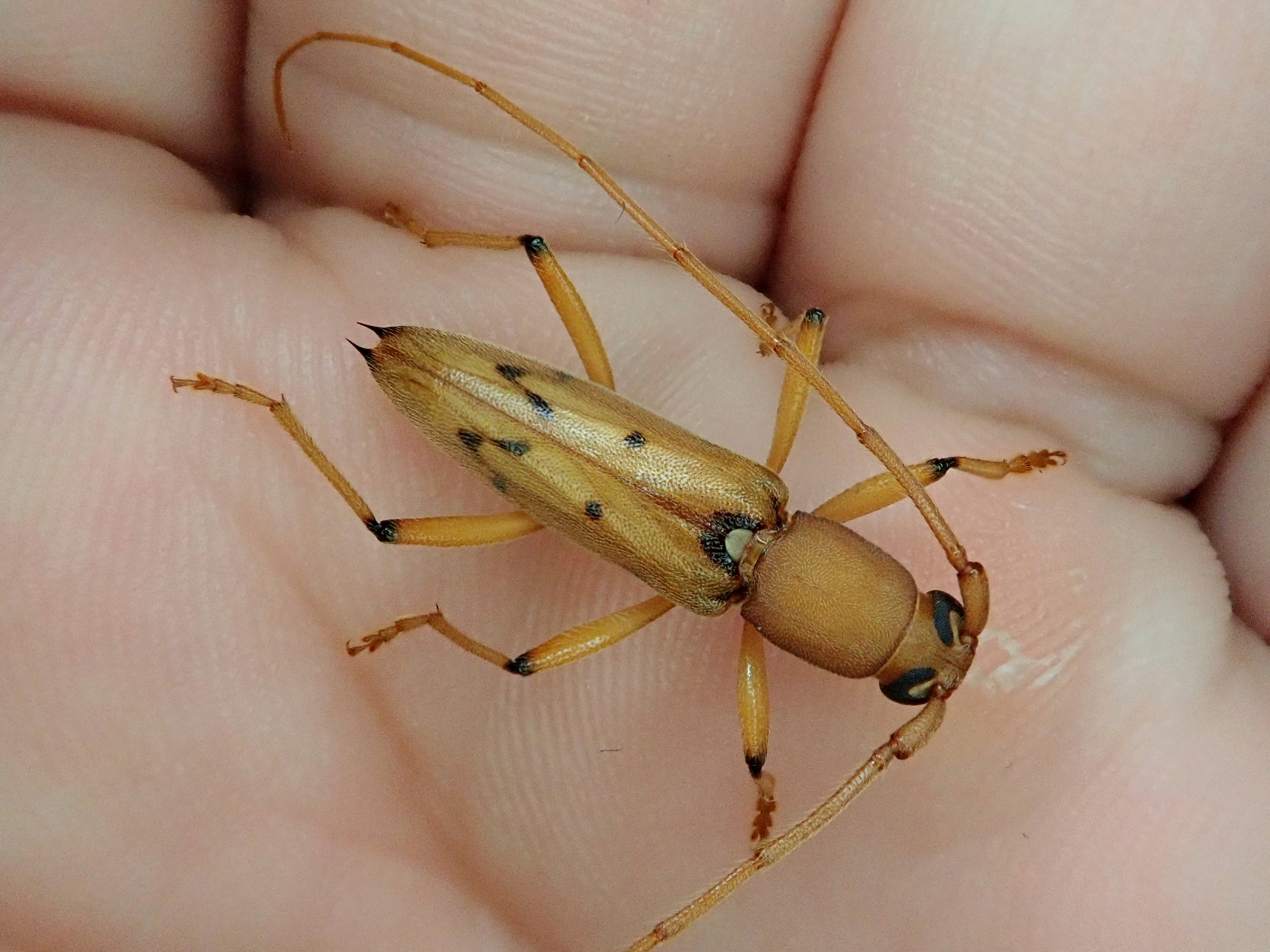
- Achryson surinamum located in Brazil.
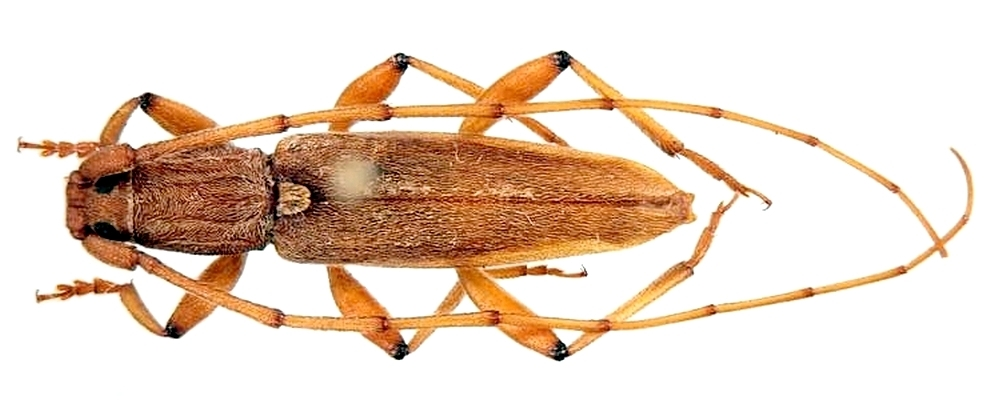
- Male Achryson immaculipenne.

Scientific classification
- Kingdom: Animalia
- Phylum: Arthropoda
- Clade: Pancrustacea
- Class: Insecta
- Order: Coleoptera
- Suborder: Polyphaga
- Infraorder: Cucujiformia
- Family: Cerambycidae
- Subfamily: Cerambycinae
- Tribe: Achrysonini
- Genus: Achryson; Audinet-Serville, 1834

Synonyms
- Achrysum Agassiz, 1846; Trichomallus Lacordaire, 1869; Trichomalus

= Achryson =

Genus of beetles

Achryson is a genus in the longhorn beetle that belongs to the tribe Achrysonini. Members of this genus are mainly found in the Neotropical realm.

== Taxonomy ==
=== Species ===
There are currently about 17 described species that belong to genus Achryson. They are listed below:

- Achryson chacoense Di Iorio, 2003 (Argentina)
- Achryson foersteri Bosq, 1953 (Argentina, Brazil, Paraguay, and Uruguay)
- Achryson immaculipenne Gounelle, 1909 (South America)
- Achryson jolyi Monné, 2006 (Venezuela)
- Achryson lineolatum Erichson, 1847 (South America)
- Achryson lutarium Burmeister, 1865 (South America)
- Achryson maculatum Burmeister, 1865 (South America)
- Achryson maculipenne (Lacordaire, 1963) (South America)
- Achryson meridionale Martins, 1976 (Brazil)
- Achryson peracchii Martins, 1976 (Brazil)
- Achryson philippii Germain, 1898 (Chile)
- Achryson pictum Bates, 1870 (South America)
- Achryson quadrimaculatum (Fabricius, 1793) (Central and South America, Caribbean)
- Achryson surinamum (Linné, 1767) (the Americas)
- Achryson undulatum Burmeister, 1865 (Uruguay, Argentina, Paraguay, and Brazil)
- Achryson uniforme Martins & Monné, 1975 (Bolivia and Paraguay)
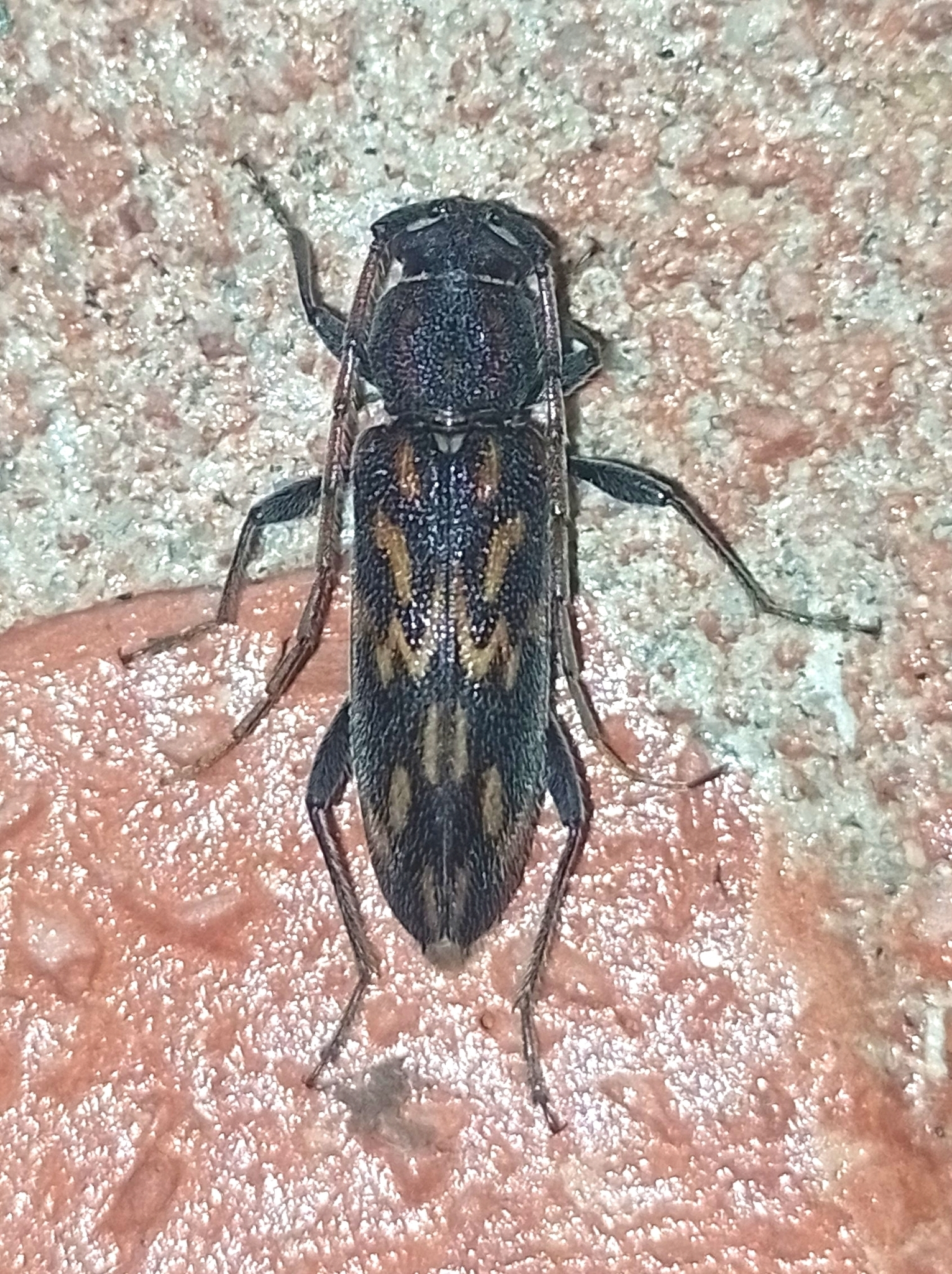
Achryson undulatum, Argentina

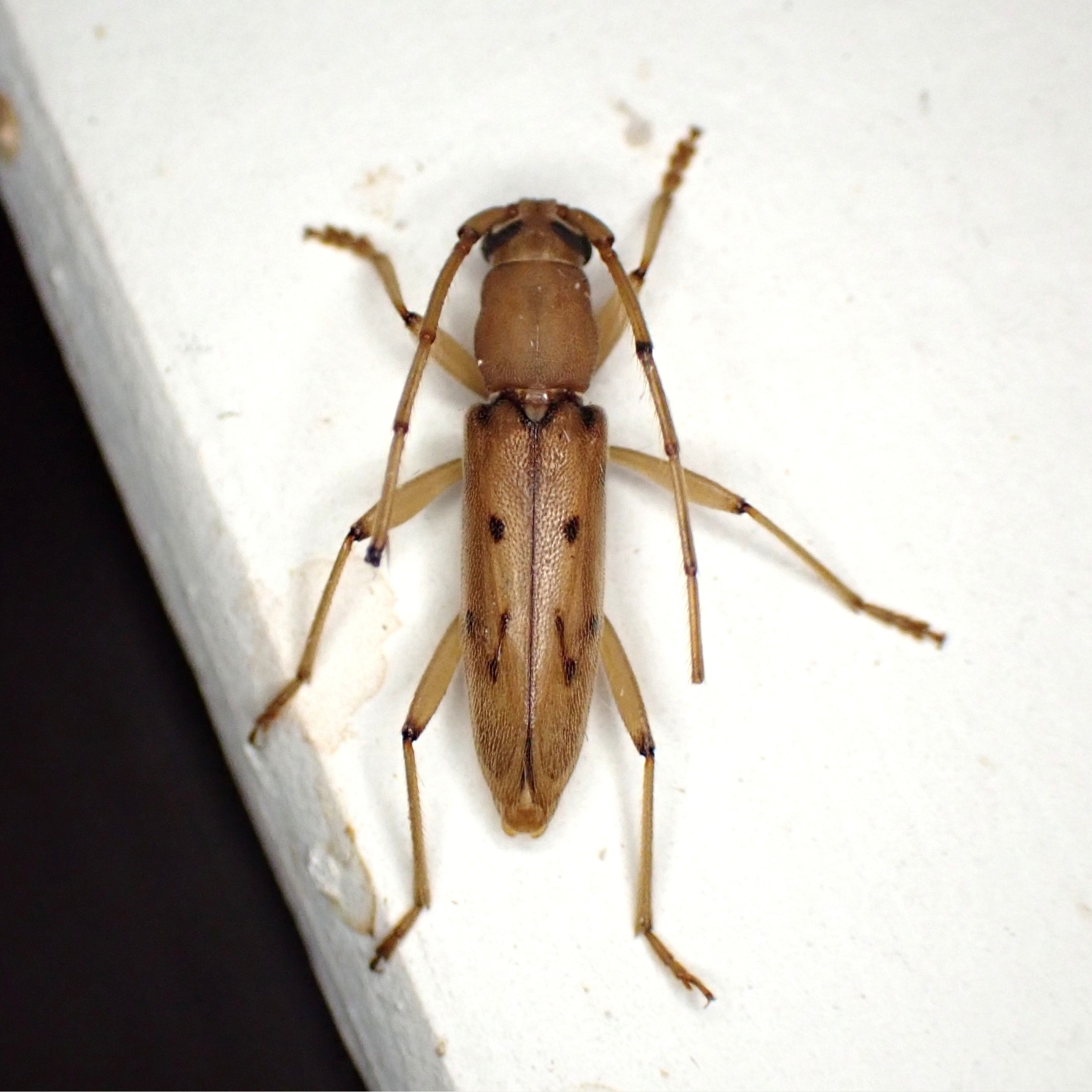
Achryson surinamum, Bolivia

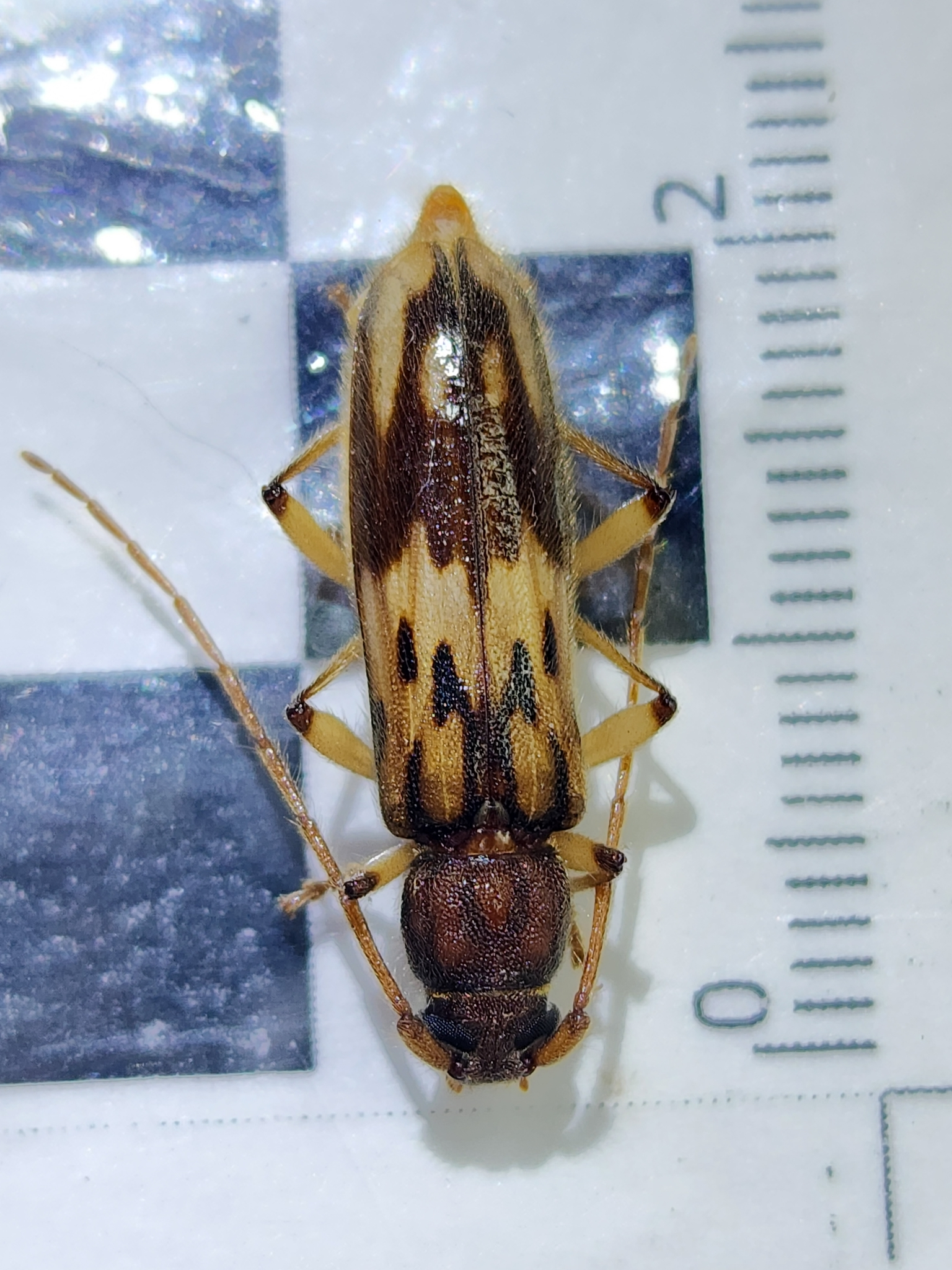
Achryson lutarium, Argentina

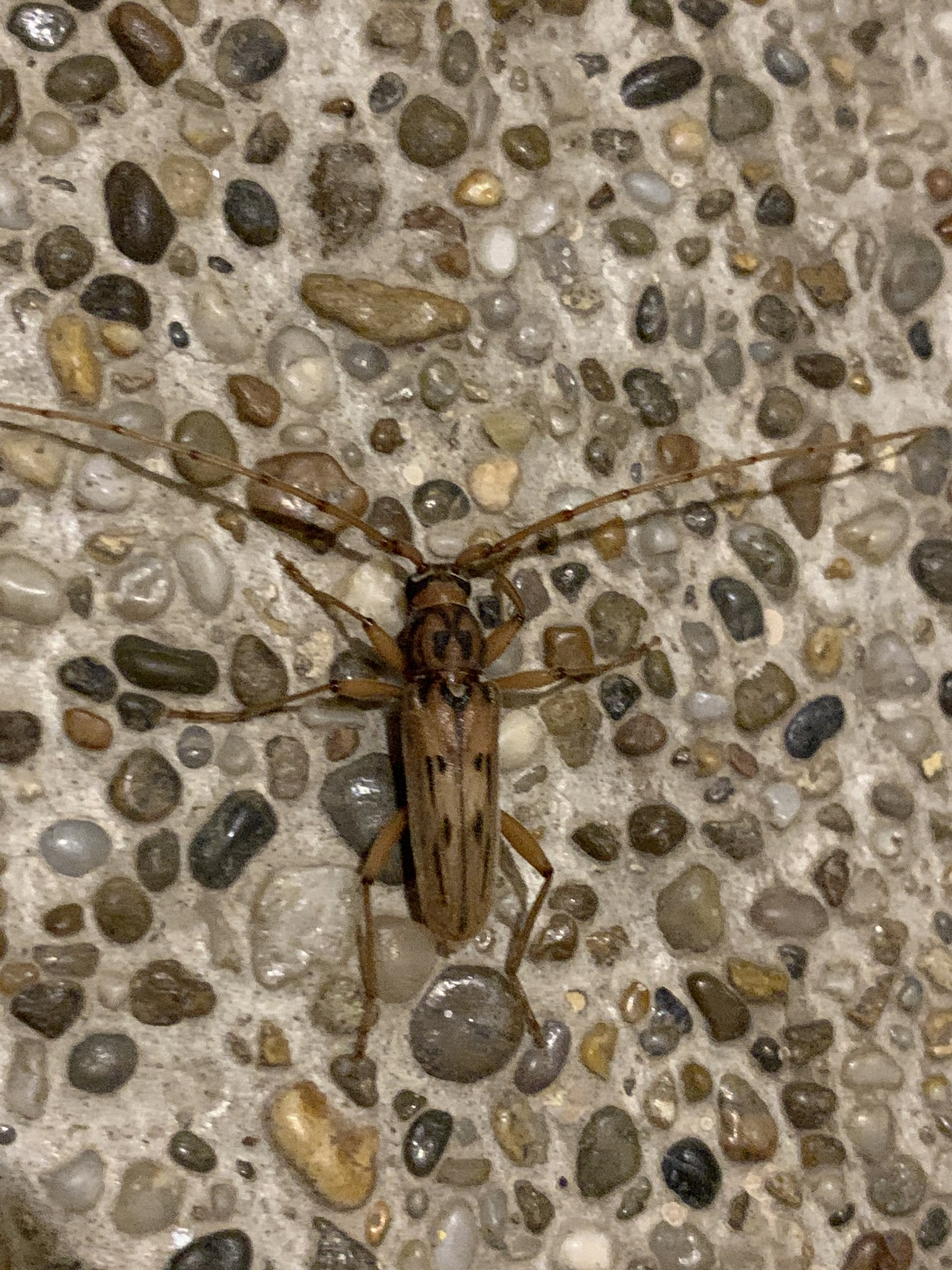
Achryson lineolatum, Ecuador

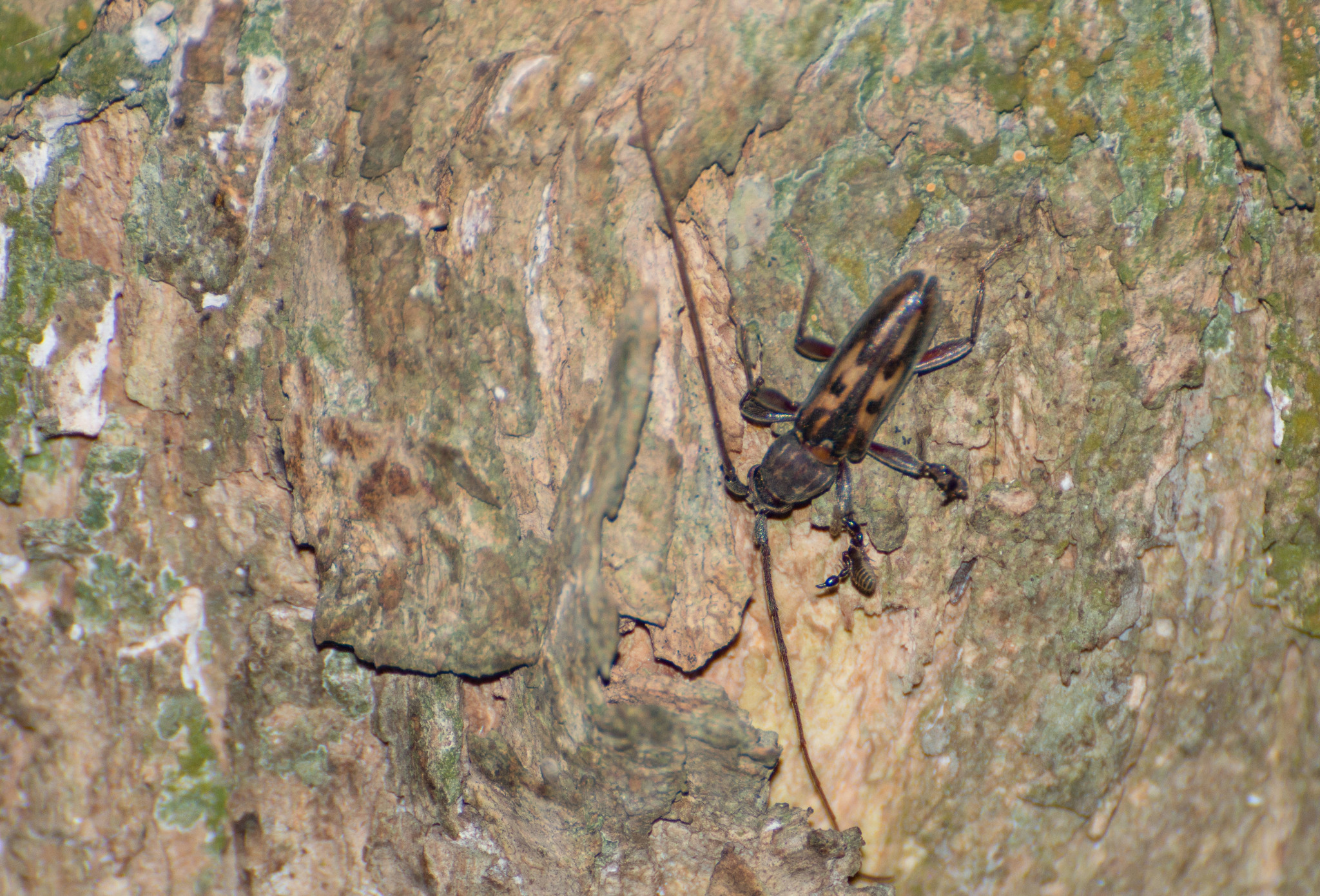
Achryson foersteri, Argentina
