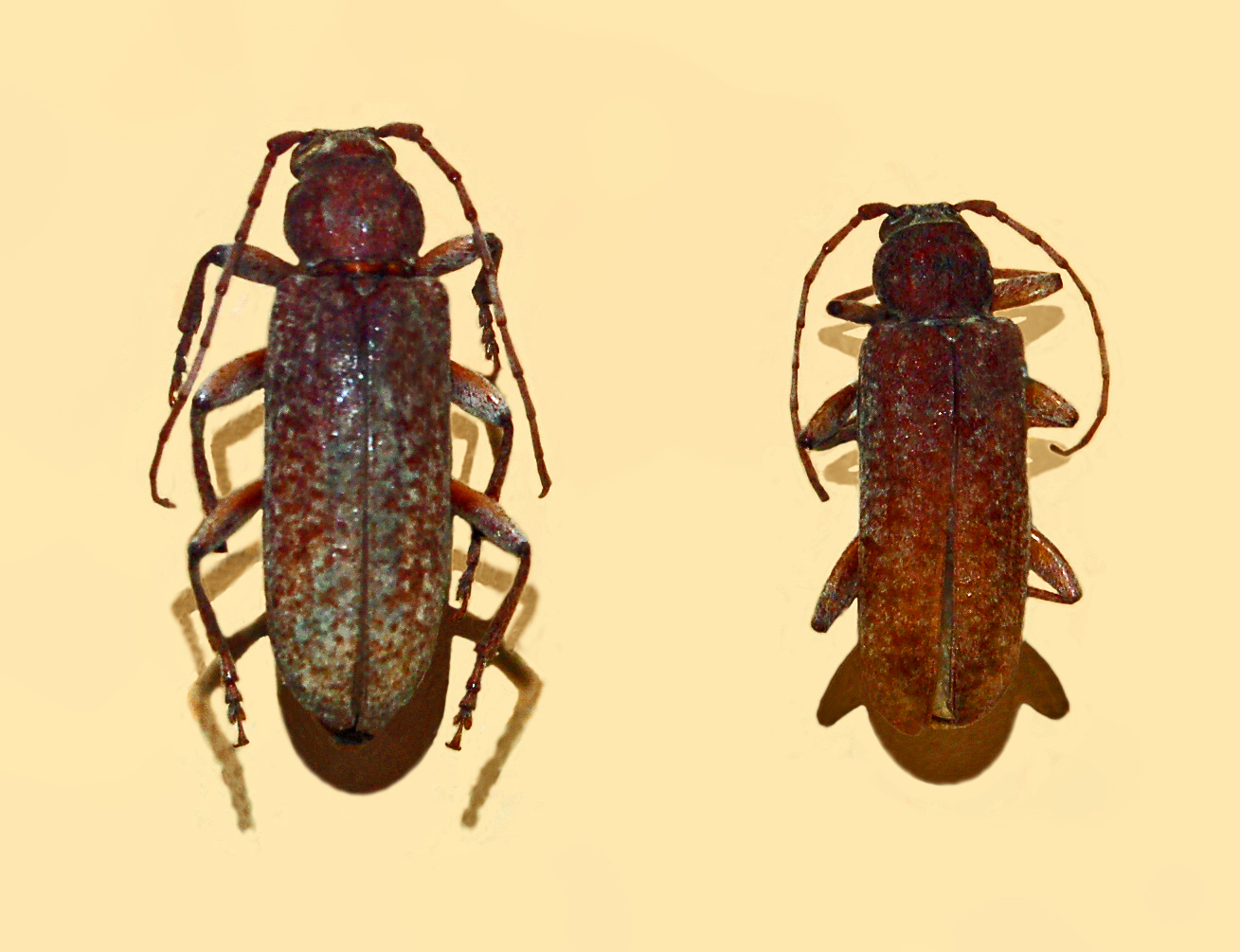
- Cotyachryson cinereus from Chile, male and female. Mounted specimens

Scientific classification
- Kingdom: Animalia
- Phylum: Arthropoda
- Class: Insecta
- Order: Coleoptera
- Suborder: Polyphaga
- Infraorder: Cucujiformia
- Family: Cerambycidae
- Genus: Cotyachryson
- Species: C. cinereus

Binomial name
- Cotyachryson cinereus (Porter, 1925)

Synonyms
- Cotyachryson philippii (Porter, 1925); Hesperophanes cinereus Blanchard in Gay, 1851 nec Villers, 1789; Hesperophanes gayi Plavilstshikov, 1921; Hesperophanes philippi Porter, 1925

= Cotyachryson cinereus =

Species of beetle

Cotyachryson cinereus is a species of round-necked longhorn beetles belonging to the family Cerambycidae, subfamily Cerambycinae.

== Distribution ==
This species can be found in Chile.
