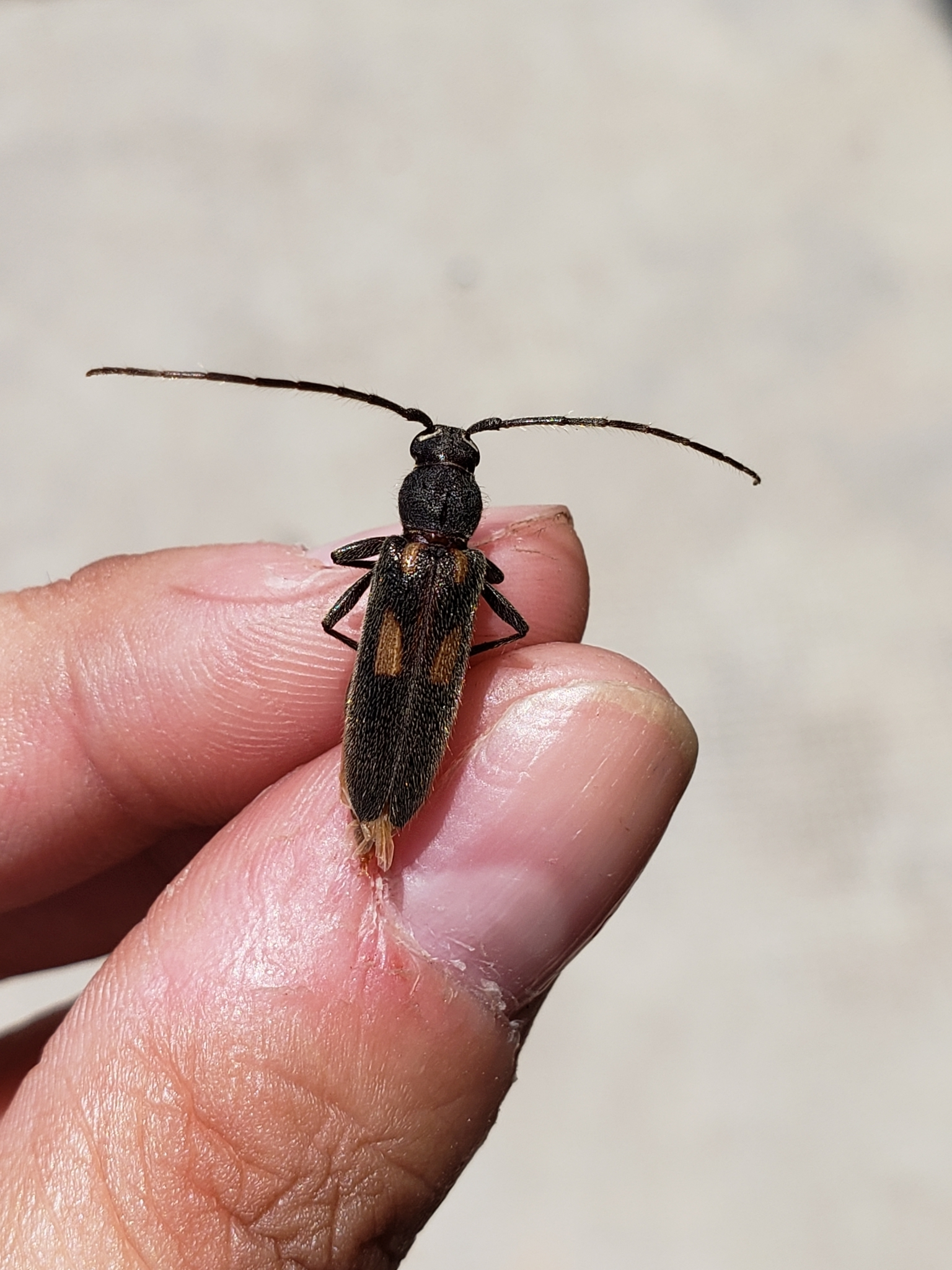

Scientific classification
- Kingdom: Animalia
- Phylum: Arthropoda
- Class: Insecta
- Order: Coleoptera
- Suborder: Polyphaga
- Infraorder: Cucujiformia
- Family: Cerambycidae
- Subfamily: Cerambycinae
- Tribe: Achrysonini
- Genus: Achryson
- Species: A. maculatum

Binomial name
- Achryson maculatum Burmeister, 1865

Synonyms
- Achryson maculatum fusculum Plavilstshikov, 1927

= Achryson maculatum =

Species of beetle

Achryson maculatum is a species of longhorn beetle in the Cerambycinae subfamily. It was described by Hermann Burmeister in 1865. It is known from southeastern Brazil, Paraguay, Argentina, Uruguay, and Bolivia.
