= Xenocompsa =

Scientific classification
- Kingdom: Animalia
- Phylum: Arthropoda
- Class: Insecta
- Order: Coleoptera
- Suborder: Polyphaga
- Infraorder: Cucujiformia
- Family: Cerambycidae
- Subfamily: Cerambycinae
- Tribe: Achrysonini
- Genus: Xenocompsa; Martins, 1965

Genus of insects

Xenocompsa is a genus in the longhorn beetle family Cerambycidae. There are at least three described species in Xenocompsa.

== Species ==
These three species belong to the genus Xenocompsa:

- Xenocompsa flavonitida (Fairmaire & Germain, 1859) (Argentina and Chile)
- Xenocompsa martinsi Cerda, 1980 (Chile)
- Xenocompsa semipolita (Fairmaire & Germain, 1859) (Chile)
