= Chloroleucon chacoense =

Conservation status
- Vulnerable (IUCN 2.3)

Scientific classification
- Kingdom: Plantae
- Clade: Tracheophytes
- Clade: Angiosperms
- Clade: Eudicots
- Clade: Rosids
- Order: Fabales
- Family: Fabaceae
- Subfamily: Caesalpinioideae
- Clade: Mimosoid clade
- Genus: Chloroleucon
- Species: C. chacoense

Binomial name
- Chloroleucon chacoense (Burk.) Barneby & J.W.Grimes

Species of legume

Chloroleucon chacoense, the palo barroso or palo overo, is a species of flowering plant in the family Fabaceae. It is found in Argentina, Bolivia, and Paraguay. It is threatened by habitat loss and climate change.
