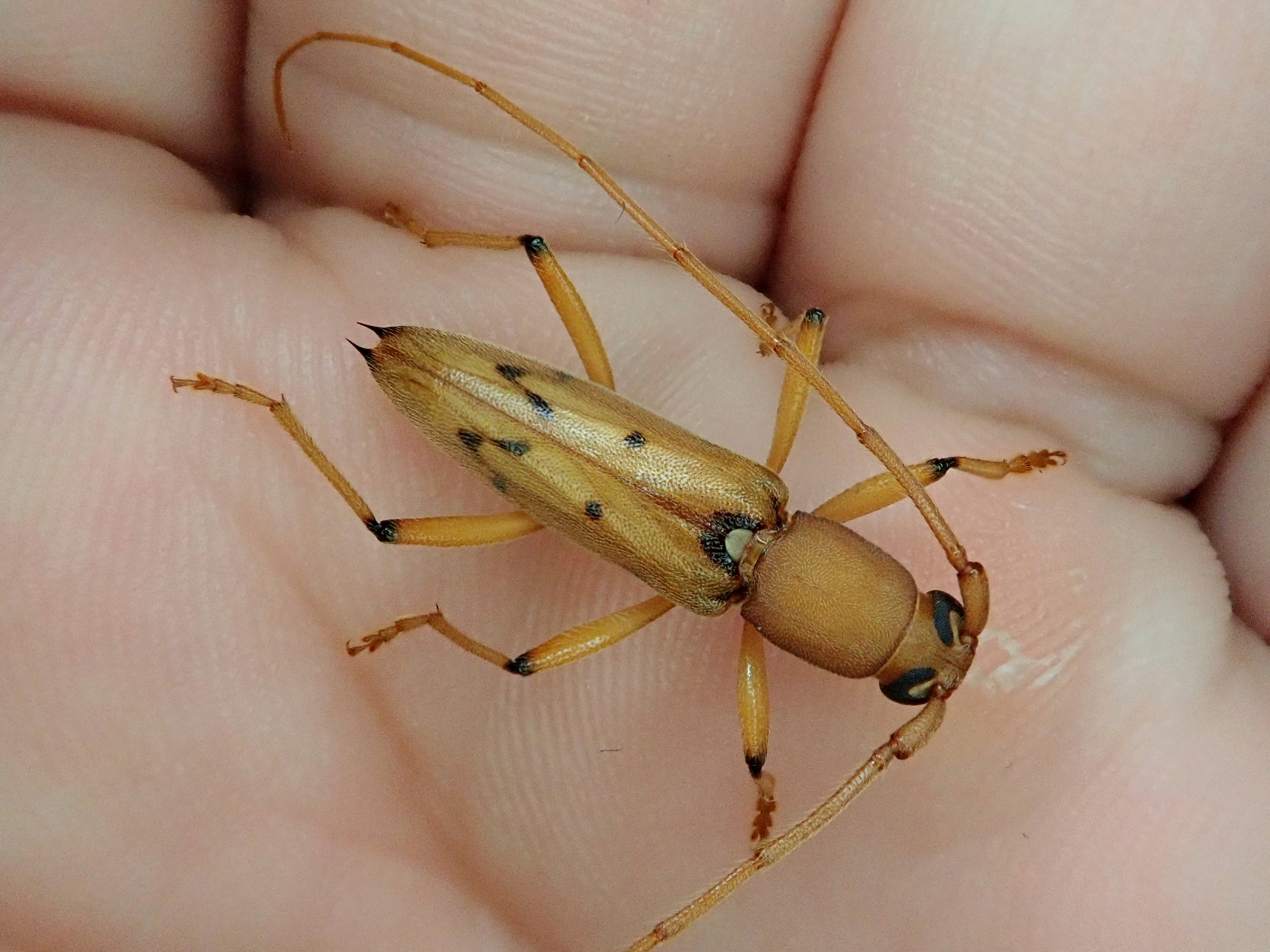
- Achryson surinamum, Brazil

Scientific classification
- Kingdom: Animalia
- Phylum: Arthropoda
- Class: Insecta
- Order: Coleoptera
- Suborder: Polyphaga
- Infraorder: Cucujiformia
- Family: Cerambycidae
- Subfamily: Cerambycinae
- Tribe: Achrysonini; Lacordaire 1868

= Achrysonini =

Tribe of beetles

Achrysonini is a tribe of Long-Horned Beetles in the beetle family Cerambycidae. There are more than 20 genera and 50 described species in Achrysonini. They are found mainly in the Americas, but also in Europe, Asia, and Africa.

== Genera ==
These 21 genera belong to the tribe Achrysonini:

- Abyarachryson Martins, 2002
- Acalopus Franz, 1961
- Achryson Audinet-Serville, 1833
- Allogaster Thomson, 1864
- Aquinillum Thomson, 1878
- Araespor Thomson, 1878
- Capegaster Adlbauer, 2006
- Cerdaia Monné, 2006
- Cotyachryson Martins, 2002
- Crotchiella Israelson, 1985
- Drascalia Fairmaire & Germain, 1864
- Enosmaeus Thomson, 1878
- Esseiachryson Martins, 2002
- Geropa Casey, 1912
- Huequenia Cerda, 1986
- Icosium Lucas, 1854
- Neachryson Fisher, 1940
- Neoachryson Monné M. L. & Monné M. A., 2004
- Saporaea Thomson, 1878
- Xenocompsa Martins, 1965
- Ysachron García, Botero & Santos-Silva, 2021
