= Peterborough, New Hampshire =

- Town
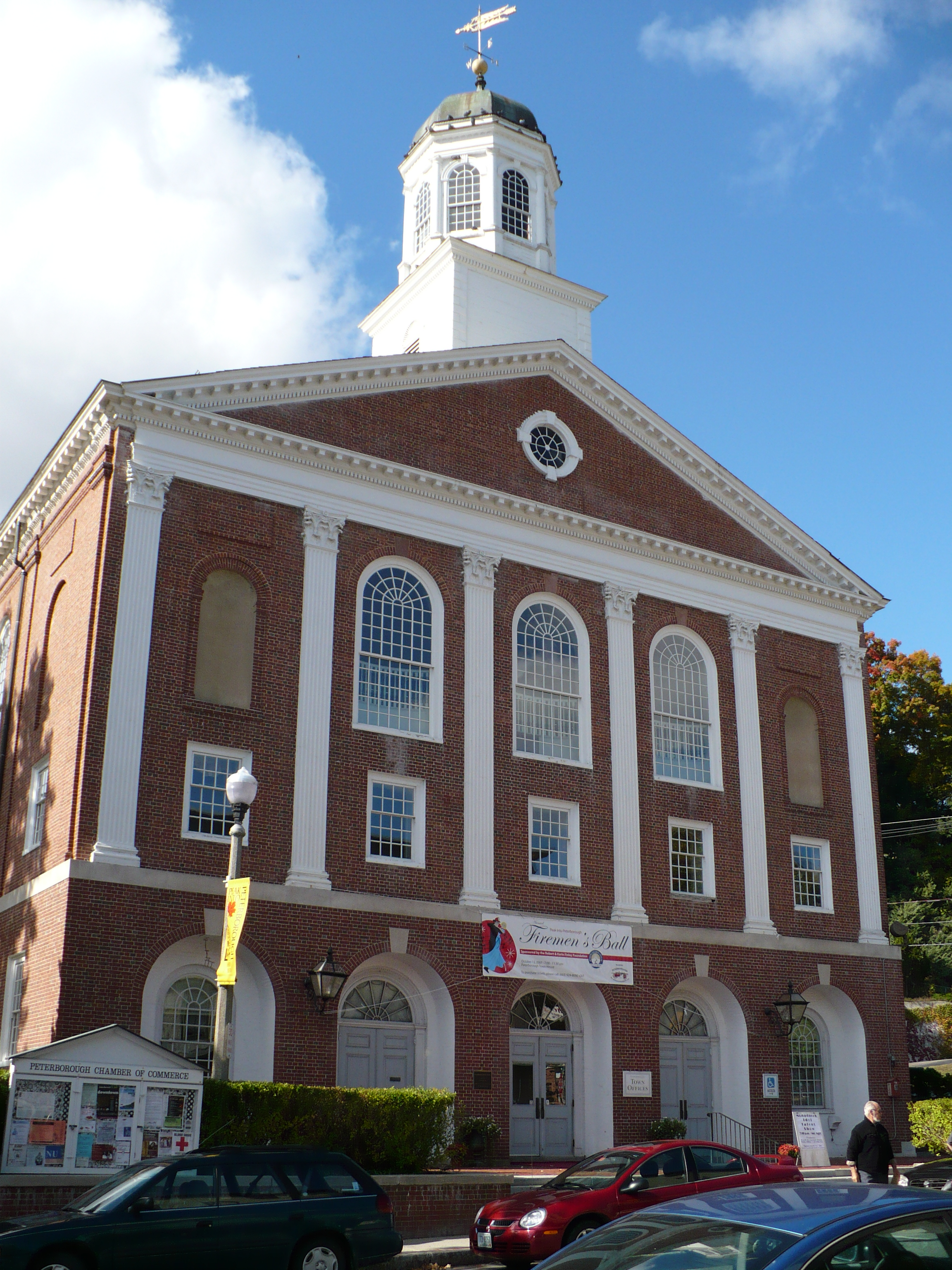
- Town House, built in 1918

- Seal

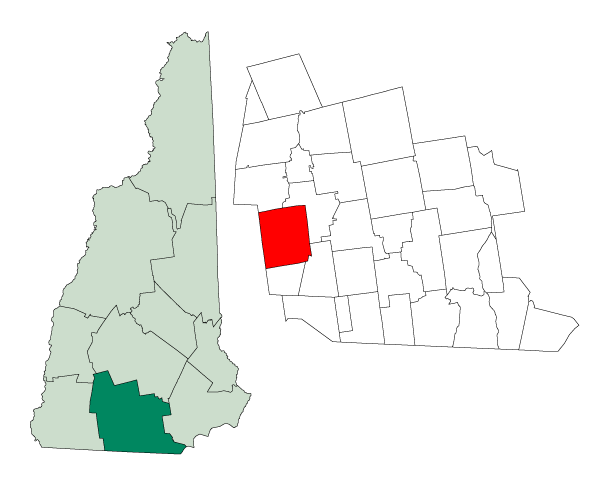
- Location in Hillsborough County, New Hampshire
- Coordinates: 42°52′14″N 71°57′06″W
- Country: United States
- State: New Hampshire
- County: Hillsborough
- Incorporated: 1760
- Villages: Peterborough; Happy Valley; Noone; North Village; West Peterborough

Government
  - Select Board: Tyler Ward, Chair; William Kennedy; Bonnie Tucker
  - Town Administrator: Nicole MacStay

Area
  - Total: 38.43 sq mi (99.53 km^{2})
  - Land: 38.02 sq mi (98.47 km^{2})
  - Water: 0.41 sq mi (1.06 km^{2}) 1.06%
- Elevation: 718 ft (219 m)

Population (2020)
  - Total: 6,418
  - Density: 169/sq mi (65.2/km^{2})
- Time zone: UTC−5 (Eastern)
  - Summer (DST): UTC−4 (Eastern)
- ZIP Code: 03458
- Area code: 603
- FIPS code: 33-60580
- GNIS feature ID: 0873697
- Website: www.peterboroughnh.gov

Peterborough is a town in Hillsborough County, New Hampshire, United States. The population was 6,418 at the 2020 census. The main village, with 3,090 people at the 2020 census, is a census-designated place (CDP) and lies along the Contoocook River at the junction of U.S. Route 202 and New Hampshire Route 101. Peterborough is 38 miles (61 km) west of Manchester and 72 miles (116 km) northwest of Boston.

== History ==
Granted by Massachusetts in 1737, it was first permanently settled in 1749. The town suffered several attacks during the French and Indian War. Nevertheless, by 1759, there were fifty families settled. Incorporated on January 17, 1760, by Governor Benning Wentworth, it was named after Lieutenant Peter Prescott (1709–1784) of Concord, Massachusetts, a prominent land speculator.

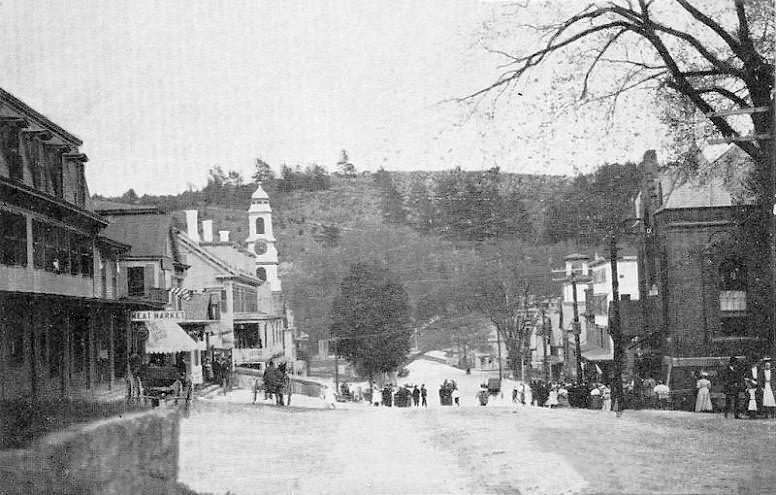
Main Street, c. 1906

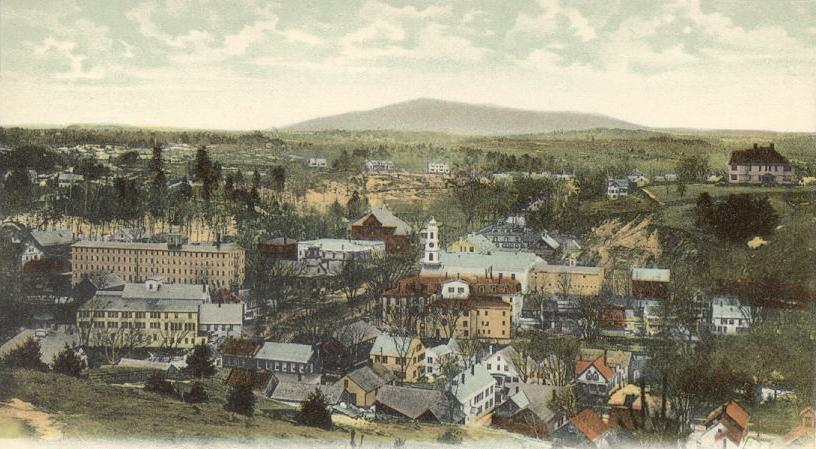
Peterborough, 1907

The Contoocook River and Nubanusit Brook offered numerous sites for watermills, and Peterborough became a prosperous mill town. In 1810, the first cotton factory was established. By 1859, when the population was 2,222, there were four more cotton factories and a woolen mill. Other industries included two paper mills, an iron foundry, a machine shop, a carriage factory, a basket-maker, a maker of trusses and supporters, a boot and shoe factory, seven sawmills, and three gristmills.

The Reverend Abiel Abbot, after being charged with heresy by the Connecticut religious establishment, came to Peterborough as minister to the Peterborough Unitarian Church in 1827. He founded the town's first prep school, the Monadnock Summer Lyceum, and the first free library in the US, all in Peterborough.

Peterborough established the first tax-supported free public library in the United States, in 1833. Its success led the New Hampshire State Legislature to pass legislation in 1849 authorizing towns to raise money to establish and maintain their own libraries. The library was in the town's general store and post office, and the postmaster served as librarian. The library moved to the town hall in 1873.

Other early cultural institutions include Mariarden, a summer theatre, where Paul Robeson played in Eugene O'Neill's The Emperor Jones. Bette Davis performed there in her teens.

Performance blossomed again in 1976, when Widdie and Jonathon Hall founded the Peterborough Folkway. "Within a few years, it became a 'must play' on the East Coast for folk musicians"; it remained popular for two decades. Regular performers included Tom Paxton, Mary Chapin Carpenter, Shawn Colvin, and Suzanne Vega.

In the 1980s, thanks to publisher Wayne Green, "Peterborough was clearly the per capita magazine production capital of the world." Over 100 magazines, mostly about computers and technology, were published there; these included Byte and MacComputing.

Peterborough's leadership in environmental protection began in the 1990s, when its Earth Day USA office supported the United States Air Force's annual Earth Day events around the world.

== Geography ==
The town is 38.4 square miles (99.5 km^{2}), of which 38.0 square miles (98.5 km^{2}) are land and 0.42 square miles (1.1 km^{2}) (1.06%) are water. Peterborough is drained by the Contoocook River and its tributaries, Nubanusit Brook and Otter Brook. The entire town is part of the Merrimack River watershed. The highest point in Peterborough as well as in Hillsborough County is the summit of South Pack Monadnock (2,290 feet (698 m) above sea level), in Miller State Park in the southeast corner of town. Peterborough is also home to Edward MacDowell Dam and Lake recreation area, where visitors can walk across the dam, hike, cross-country ski, swim, boat, picnic, play Frisbee golf, play horseshoes, and take advantage of other recreational opportunities, many of them accessible to people with disabilities. The town is crossed by U.S. Route 202 and Route 101.

== Demographics ==
Historical population
Census	Pop.	Note	%±
1790	861		—
1800	1,333		54.8%
1810	1,537		15.3%
1820	1,500		−2.4%
1830	1,984		32.3%
1840	2,163		9.0%
1850	2,222		2.7%
1860	2,265		1.9%
1870	2,236		−1.3%
1880	2,206		−1.3%
1890	2,507		13.6%
1900	2,527		0.8%
1910	2,277		−9.9%
1920	2,615		14.8%
1930	2,521		−3.6%
1940	2,470		−2.0%
1950	2,556		3.5%
1960	2,963		15.9%
1970	3,807		28.5%
1980	4,895		28.6%
1990	5,239		7.0%
2000	5,883		12.3%
2010	6,284		6.8%
2020	6,418		2.1%
2024 (est.)	6,433		0.2%
U.S. Decennial Census

As of the 2010 United States census, there were 6,284 people, 2,713 households, and 1,629 families residing in the town. The population density was 167.0 inhabitants per square mile (64.5/km^{2}). There were 2,956 housing units at an average density of 78.4 per square mile (30.3/km^{2}). The racial makeup of the town was 96.1% White, 1.8% Asian, 0.7% Black or African American, 0.2% Native American, 0.02% Pacific Islander, 0.4% some other race, and 0.8% from two or more races. Hispanic or Latino of any race were 1.4% of the population.

There were 2,713 households, out of which 28.1% had children under the age of 18 living with them, 45.8% were headed by married couples living together, 10.6% had a female householder with no husband present, and 40.0% were non-families. Of all households 33.6% were made up of individuals, and 15.2% were someone living alone who was 65 years of age or older. The average household size was 2.24, and the average family size was 2.85.

In the town, the population was spread out, with 21.5% under the age of 18, 6.2% from 18 to 24, 19.9% from 25 to 44, 30.3% from 45 to 64, and 22.0% who were 65 years of age or older. The median age was 46.6 years. For every 100 females, there were 86.9 males. For every 100 females age 18 and over, there were 81.7 males.

For the period 2009–2013, the estimated median annual income for a household in the town was $66,026, and the median income for a family was $89,401. Male full-time workers had a median income of $66,314 versus $34,707 for females. The per capita income for the town was $40,385.

== Economy ==
Peterborough is a global village and entrepreneurial seedbed. Start-ups in Peterborough have included New Hampshire Ball Bearing, Microspec, Pure Flow, Peterboro Basket Company, Borrego Solar, MobileRobots Inc., Toadstool Bookshops, Froling Energy, Brookstone, SoClean and Hyndsight Vision Systems. Approximately a third of Peterborough workers are home-based entrepreneurs or remote workers.

Like the rest of New Hampshire and the Monadnock region, Peterborough's third largest industry is tourism.

Its cultural attractions include the Monadnock Center for History and Culture, the exhibition gallery and craft gallery of the Sharon Arts Center, the Peterborough Players theatre, Peterborough Community Theater cinema, Monadnock Music concerts, the Monadnock Summer Lyceum, MAXT Makerspace and Mariposa Children's Museum. Peterborough's First Saturday contradances are a place for singles and dance enthusiasts to enjoy live music in the spacious Peterborough Town Hall.

== Politics ==
2022 Hillsborough 33rd New Hampshire House of Representatives Election, Democratic primary
Party	Candidate	Votes	%
Democratic	Jonah Wheeler	817	34.9
Democratic	Peter Leishman (incumbent)	777	33.2
Democratic	Ivy Vann (incumbent)	744	31.8
Total votes		2,338	100.0

2022 Hillsborough 33rd New Hampshire House of Representatives Election, General Election
Party	Candidate	Votes	%
Democratic	Jonah Wheeler	2,538	36.0
Democratic	Peter Leishman (incumbent)	2,433	34.5
Republican	Rachel Maidment	1,054	15.0
Republican	Matthew Pilcher	1,020	14.5
Total votes		7,045	100.0

2024 Hillsborough 33rd New Hampshire House of Representatives Election, Democratic primary
Party	Candidate	Votes	%
Democratic	Jonah Wheeler (incumbent)	1,009	37.8
Democratic	Peter Leishman (incumbent)	968	36.3
Democratic	Ivy Vann	690	25.9
Total votes		2,667	100.0

2024 Hillsborough 33rd New Hampshire House of Representatives Election, General Election
Party	Candidate	Votes	%
Democratic	Peter Leishman (incumbent)	2,932	39.6
Democratic	Jonah Wheeler (incumbent)	2,920	39.4
Republican	Kimberly Thomas	1,555	21.0
Total votes		7,407	100.0

== Arts and culture ==
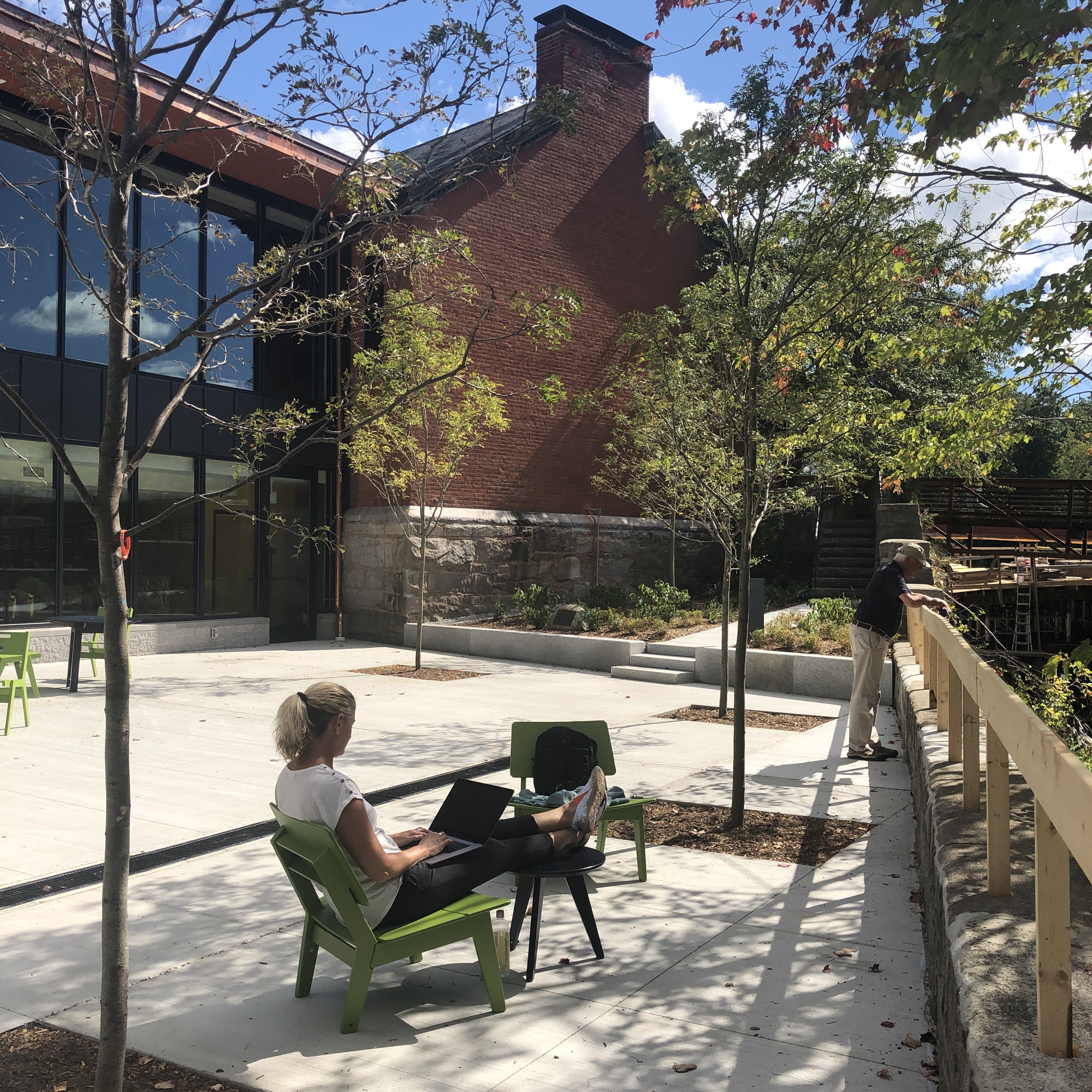
Peterborough Town Library, 2021

Many artists' introduction to the town comes as fellows to the MacDowell Colony, a wooded creative retreat that provides grants to about 300 artists per year.

The town celebrates First Friday monthly with presentations by MacDowell artists, gallery openings, shopping, live music, and local pubs.

The Peterborough Diner, a Worcester railway lunch car in the center of the village square, attracts many presidential hopefuls every four years.

Peterborough hosts the Snow Ball in January, Children and the Arts Day in May, Thing in the Spring music festival in June, and Greenerborough, a summer festival promoting the town's sustainability.

The Moses Cheney house in Peterborough served as a stop on the Underground Railroad in the mid-19th century.

The Peterborough Players, a professional repertory theatre, have performed since 1933.

New Hampshire's oldest continuously active state militia unit, the Lafayette Artillery Company, was founded in Peterborough in 1804. It is now based in nearby Lyndeborough. Since the early 20th century, Peterborough has been home to the Amoskeag Veterans, founded in Manchester in 1855.

The Mariposa Museum houses a collection of marionettes and puppets.

== Parks and recreation ==
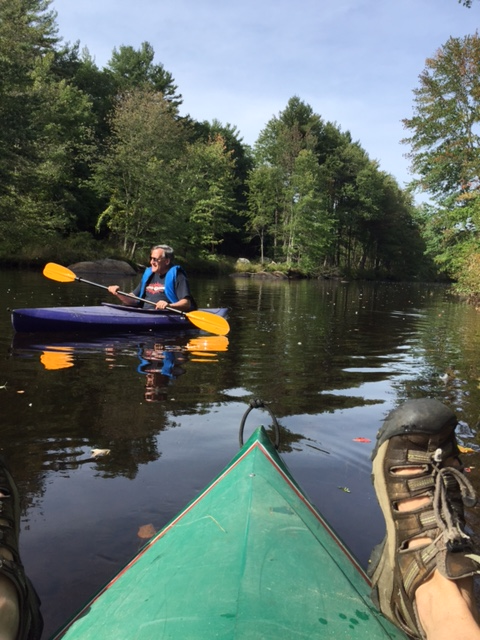
Kayaking in Peterborough

The town's outdoor amenities include hiking trails, wild flowers, cross-country skiing, kayaking, cycling and small lakes for swimming, sailing, fishing and ice-skating. It is a popular bird-watching area, one of two sites of the NH Audubon autumn migratory raptor count.

== Education ==
The public schools are part of Contoocook Valley school district (SAU 1) which has a total of 11 schools and one applied technology center.

- ConVal Regional High School, built in 1970, serves approximately 700 students.
- South Meadow School, founded in 1989, serves approximately 400 students. The school began as Peterborough Middle School.
- Peterborough Elementary School, locally known as PES, serves approximately 250 students.
- While the area has many private kindergartens, pre-schools and elementaries, The Well School, founded in 1967, is the only Pre-8 school within the town. The Well is a day school that serves approximately 160 students on an extensive rural campus.
- Clay Mathematics Institute, a foundation supporting mathematics research.

== Media ==
The Monadnock Ledger-Transcript is published twice-weekly.

== Infrastructure ==
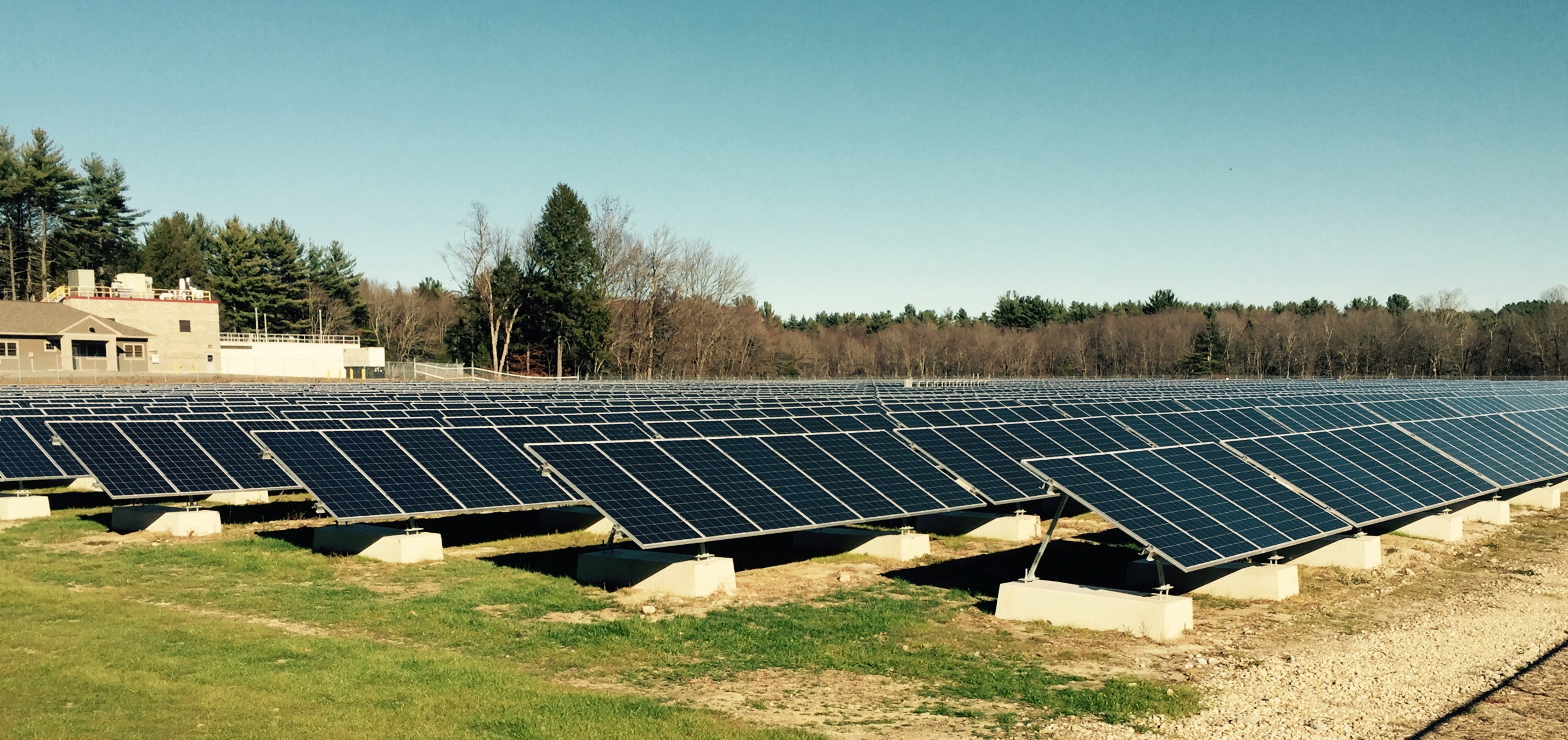
Peterborough's solar energy facility was the largest in New Hampshire when installed.

The town wants to achieve 100 percent reliance on sustainable energy, and built the largest solar facility in New Hampshire, next to its wastewater treatment plant.

== Notable people ==
- Abiel Abbot (1765–1859), minister, educator and founder of the first free library
- Adam "Adeem the Artist" Arnone (born 1978), rapper
- Charles Bass (born 1952), US congressman
- Perkins Bass (1912–2011), US congressman
- Robert P. Bass (1873–1960), farmer, forestry expert, 53rd governor of New Hampshire
- Jotham Blanchard (1800–1839), lawyer, newspaper editor, Canadian politician
- Ingrid Chavez (born 1965), actress, musician
- Moses Cheney (1793–1875), abolitionist, legislator, and founder of Bates College
- Person Colby Cheney (1828–1901), manufacturer, abolitionist, US senator, 35th governor of New Hampshire
- Francis Joseph Christian (born 1942), retired auxiliary bishop, Diocese of Manchester
- Frank Gay Clarke (1850–1901), US congressman
- Landon T. Clay (1926–2017), businessman, philanthropist, art collector, founder of Clay Mathematics Institute
- Daniel Bateman Cutter (1808–1889), physician and member of the New Hampshire General Court
- Matt Deis (born 1983), musician
- Jeanne Dietsch (born 1952), entrepreneur, state senator
- Richard Despard Estes (1928–2022), author, ethologist
- Wayne Green (1922–2013), publisher
- Joseph Hart (born 1976), artist
- Joanne Head (1930–2021), member of the New Hampshire House of Representatives
- Sam Huntington (born 1982), actor
- Beth Krommes (born 1956), illustrator, winner of 2009 Caldecott Medal
- Edward MacDowell (1860–1908), composer
- Marian MacDowell (1857–1956), founder of the MacDowell Colony
- Bob "Mr. Mac" McQuillen (1923–2014), teacher, musician, prolific composer of contra dance tunes; recognized as a National Heritage Fellow
- James Miller (1776–1851), US congressman, general
- Luke Miller (1815–1881), physician, businessman, and Minnesota state senator
- Elting E. Morison (1909–1995), US historian, professor emeritus at MIT, founder of the MIT's Program in Science, Technology and Society (known as STS), lived and died in Peterborough
- Eddie Mottau, guitarist
- George Swinnerton Parker (1866–1952), originator of the Parker Brothers game and toy company; his house in Peterborough was the basis for the murder mystery game Clue, known outside North America as Cluedo
- Walter R. Peterson, Jr. (1922–2011), realtor, educator, 72nd governor of New Hampshire
- Jeremiah Smith (1759–1842), jurist, US congressman, 9th governor of New Hampshire
- Robert Smith (1802–1867), US congressman
- Samuel Smith (1765–1842), manufacturer, US congressman
- John Hardy Steele (1789–1865), mechanic, manufacturer, 19th governor of New Hampshire
- Elizabeth Marshall Thomas (born 1931), author
- George Walker (1824–1888), attorney, state congressman, banker, corporate executive, political adviser, prominent advocate for bimetallism and U.S. Consul-General in Paris
- Isaac Davis White (1901–1990), commanded the U.S. Army, Pacific (USARPAC) from July 1957 to March 1961
- James Wilson I (1766–1839), US congressman
- James Wilson II (1797–1881), US congressman
- John Wilson (1777–1848), US congressman
- Elizabeth Yates (1905–2001), Newbury medalist, author of 26 books including Amos Fortune, Free Man

== In popular culture ==
The town was a model for the play Our Town, written by Thornton Wilder while in residence at the MacDowell Colony. His fictional town of Grover's Corners appears to have been named for Peterborough's Grove Street.

The film The Sensation of Sight was shot entirely in Peterborough.

== See also ==
- New Hampshire Historical Marker No. 206: The MacDowell Graves
- New Hampshire Historical Marker No. 210: Settler's Rock
- New Hampshire Historical Marker No. 244: Revolutionary War Drummer William Diamond
- New Hampshire Historical Marker No. 270: Miller State Park, New Hampshire's First State Park
