= Maria Perez (New Hampshire politician) =

Salvadoran-American politician (born 1974)

María Pérez

Member of the New Hampshire House of Representatives
- In office December 2, 2020 – December 4, 2024
- Constituency: Hillsborough 43 (2022–2024); Hillsborough 23 (2020–2022)

Personal details
- Born: 1974 (age 51–52) El Salvador
- Party: Independent (since 2023)
- Other political affiliations: Democratic (before 2023)
- Children: 2
- Education: Nashua Community College; Nashua Adult Learning

María Elizabeth Pérez (born 1974) is a Salvadoran-born American politician who is a former member of the New Hampshire House of Representatives. First elected as a Democrat in 2020, Pérez left the party in 2023, citing frustration with a lack of progress on issues that were important to her and "feeling unwelcome in the party". She also said she felt disillusioned after feeling increasingly sidelined. Since, she has been an independent. Pérez represented the Hillsborough 23rd district from 2020 to 2022, and the Hillsborough 43rd district from 2022 to 2024.

== Early life and career ==
Pérez was born in El Salvador on her grandparents' farm, where she had eight brothers and sisters. Throughout her childhood, she was sexually abused by her father and at the age of 16, was sold off into an arranged marriage in the United States. On her way to there, she was raped by two Mexican border agents. The marriage itself lasted 11 years and resulted in two children.

At the age of 40, she graduated from Nashua Adult Learning and Nashua Community College. She also remarried. Before entering politics, she worked for Alene Candles, the Ford Motor Company, and Campers Inn RV. Pérez also served as a regional organizer and regional director for Amy Klobuchar's 2020 presidential campaign and field organizer for Joe Biden's 2020 presidential campaign.

== Political career ==
While in the New Hampshire House of Representatives, Pérez focused on restoring abortion access in New Hampshire, the environment, and education. She was seated on the House Children and Family Law Committee, the House Environment Committee, and the House Agriculture Committee.

In 2021, Pérez was "accused of antisemitism" after tweeting, "From the river to the sea, Palestine will be free!" and describing Israel as an apartheid state. She later deleted the tweets. She later tweeted, "I believe in a one-state solution where Jews, Muslims, Christians and others can live together with equal rights, unlike the current state of Israeli occupation and apartheid." She was then removed from the New Hampshire House Progressive Caucus's leadership.

Pérez criticized Maggie Hassan, the United States Senator from New Hampshire, after she voted in favor of an amendment to the Inflation Reduction Act of 2022 that expanded Title 42.

Pérez left the Democratic Party in 2023. This party switch was met with some negative reactions from members of the democratic caucus of the New Hampshire House of Representatives.

In January 2024, she was removed from the Hillsborough County Delegation Executive Committee due to a state law that requires members of the committee to be a member of either the political party of the majority or minority of members of the New Hampshire House of Representatives. She was removed by a 48-53 vote in which all the votes for her to remain on the executive committee were made by Republicans, with the exception of Damond Ford, Peter Leishman, and Jonah Wheeler. Sandra Panek remarked, "This is such a tragedy, Maria Perez has independent constituents who will now not have representation."

In June 2024, the National Electoral Institute of Mexico invited Pérez to represent the United States in Oaxaca during the international reporting on the 2024 Mexican general election.

She was the vice-chairwoman of the Human Rights Committee of the National Hispanic Caucus of State Legislators from 2021 to 2024.

She endorsed Marianne Williamson for president in 2024.

== Personal life ==
Pérez moved to New Hampshire from El Salvador and obtained American citizenship in 2007.

== See also ==
- List of American politicians who switched parties in office
