= Lisboasaurus =

Lisboasaurus Temporal range: Late Jurassic-Early Cretaceous, 155.7–125.45 Ma

Scientific classification
- Domain: Eukaryota
- Kingdom: Animalia
- Phylum: Chordata
- Class: Reptilia
- Clade: Archosauria
- Clade: Pseudosuchia
- Clade: Crocodylomorpha
- Genus: †Lisboasaurus; Seiffert, 1970
- Species: †L. estesi

Binomial name
- †Lisboasaurus estesi Seiffert, 1970

Extinct genus of reptiles

Lisboasaurus is a small (400 mm length) genus of Mesozoic crocodylomorph that lived in fresh water. It is known from fossilized tooth and jaw fragments of Late Jurassic and Early Cretaceous age. Two species have been described. In the past Lisboasaurus has been interpreted as an avialan, troodontid, or an anguimorph lizard. Both species are currently assigned to Crocodylomorpha, one is reassigned to the genus Lusitanisuchus.

== Discovery and naming ==
In the 1960s paleontologists From the Free University Berlin located new vertebrate fossil sites that included the lignite mines of Guimarota, near the town of Leiria, Portugal. These lignites are dated by Milner and Evans, 1991, between Bathonian (middle Jurassic) to Oxfordian (early Late Jurassic) age. Schwarz and Fechner, 2004, date them as Late Jurassic.

Seiffert, (1970, 1973), described Lisboasaurus as a genus of anguimorph lepidosaur comprising two species, L. estesi and L. mitracostatus. He subdivided the latter species into two subspecies in the first paper, but not in the second paper. In 1983 Estes listed the material as Lacertilia incertae sedis. Milner and Evans, 1991, redescribed L. estesi as a maniraptoran and, more specifically, as an early avialan or troodontid They also cast doubt on the identification of the more poorly preserved L. mistracostatus, considering it a nomen dubium. Buscalioni and Evans et al. revised this assignment by demonstrating that the material referred to L. estesi was closely allied with an Early Cretaceous crocodylomorph (LH 7991) from Las Hoyas, Spain. Buscalioni and Evans supported the nomen dubium status of L. mistracostatus. However, Schwarz and Fechner, 2004, demonstrated that the material referred to L. mistracostatus is identical to teeth and fragments found in Porto Dinheiro, and new cranial and mandibular material collected from Guimarota between 1973 and 1982. They referred all L. mistracostatus specimens to a new genus they erected, Lusitanisuchus, creating the new name Lusitanisuchus mistracostatus.

Schwarz and Fechner (2008) described a new dentary from the Uña coal mine of Cuenca province, Spain. Its teeth demonstrate that it belongs to Lisboasaurus. This dentary was the first Lisboasaurus fossil from the Barremian age of the Early Cretaceous. The new data extracted from the dentary make it more certain that Lisboasaurus was a neosuchian crocodylomorph.
