= Hypsodontus =

Hypsodontus Temporal range: Miocene

Scientific classification
- Kingdom: Animalia
- Phylum: Chordata
- Class: Mammalia
- Infraclass: Placentalia
- Order: Artiodactyla
- Family: Bovidae
- Subfamily: †Hypsodontinae
- Genus: †Hypsodontus; Sokolov, 1949

Type species
- Hypsodontus miocenicus Sokolov, 1949

Extinct genus of bovid

Hypsodontus is an extinct genus of Bovidae from subfamily Hypsodontinae. It was originally described from a single jaw fragment of its type species H. miocenicus Sokolov, 1949, found in the North Caucasus of Russia, Middle Miocene. Includes five species.

== Characteristics ==
Size medium. Molars with relatively high crowns, lacking additional columns and tubercles. Second and third molars with clear outer folds on anterior margins; other margins rounded. Third molar talonid narrow.
