= Reverend Abiel Abbot =

Reverend Abiel Abbot (December 14, 1765 – January 31, 1859) was a Unitarian minister and founder of the first tax-funded free public library.

Abbot was born in 1765 to Abiel and Dorcas Abbot in Wilton, New Hampshire. He graduated from Harvard University in 1787, and received his D.D. in 1838. In 1827 he was installed as the minister of the Congregational Church in Peterborough, New Hampshire. He continued to minister until his retirement in 1849.

In 1833 at Peterborough, during a town meeting, a proposal was made that a portion of the State Literary Fund be used for the purchase of books to establish a library, free to all the citizens of Peterborough. Books purchased by Reverend Abbot and a board of trustees were made available for public use and initially housed in the general store.

In 1965, the bicentennial of Abbot's birth, the New Hampshire State Legislature passed a resolution recognizing Abbot's role in founding the "first free public library in the world supported by taxation". The resolution also requested that a postage stamp be issued to commemorate the event.
