= Jonah Wheeler =

American politician and activist

Member of the New Hampshire House of Representatives from Hillsborough's 33rd district
- Incumbent
- Assumed office December 7, 2022 Serving with Peter Leishman
- Preceded by: Ivy Vann (redistricted)

Personal details
- Born: Jonah Orion Wheeler; March 1, 2003 (age 23) Peterborough, New Hampshire, U.S.
- Party: Democratic

Jonah Orion Wheeler (born March 1, 2003) is an American politician and activist currently serving as a member of the New Hampshire House of Representatives, representing Hillsborough County District 33, which encompasses Peterborough and Sharon, for the Democratic Party.

Wheeler assumed office on December 7, 2022. Having been sworn in when he was 19 years old, he was among the youngest state legislators in the United States.

For fostering bipartisan collaboration, both Wheeler and Valerie McDonnell were recipients of the Congressman John Lewis Youth Leadership Award from the National Association of Secretaries of State.

== Early life and education ==
Wheeler was born on March 1, 2003, in Peterborough, New Hampshire. Wheeler graduated from ConVal Regional High School in 2021.

== Political career ==
Prior to political office, Wheeler had worked on the Bernie Sanders 2020 presidential campaign and interned for the progressive group Rights & Democracy. On June 20, 2020, Wheeler was a speaker at a George Floyd rally in Peterborough, New Hampshire.

Wheeler was then appointed as an alternate on the Zoning Board of Adjustments in Peterborough, New Hampshire, a position he would hold until 2025. On November 8, 2022, Wheeler was elected to the New Hampshire House of Representatives, having received more votes than the two incumbent Democratic Representatives Peter Leishman and Ivy Vann, consequently unseating Vann, who had served in the House since 2014. He assumed office on December 7, 2022.

On December 20, 2023, Wheeler endorsed Marianne Williamson in the 2024 Democratic Party presidential primaries. On January 6, 2024, Wheeler was selected as a New Hampshire's 2nd congressional district primary delegate for the Marianne Williamson 2024 presidential campaign. Prior to his support for Williamson, Wheeler expressed support for presidential candidate Robert F. Kennedy Jr.

In 2024, Wheeler broke with his party to vote in favor of a bill that would ban gender-affirming surgeries for minors. In 2025, only two Democratic House members, Wheeler and Peter Leishman, both of Peterborough, voted against their party and in favor of House Bill 148 (a bill to eliminate transgender protections established by a 2018 anti-discrimination law). All other House and Senate members voted along party lines (Democrats against the bill, Republicans in favor of it). Wheeler has been criticized by Democratic politicians for voting in favor of a bill that would ban some forms of gender affirming care for minors.

== Electoral history ==
2022 Hillsborough 33rd New Hampshire House of Representatives Election, Democratic primary
Party	Candidate	Votes	%
Democratic	Jonah Wheeler	817	34.9
Democratic	Peter Leishman (incumbent)	777	33.2
Democratic	Ivy Vann (incumbent)	744	31.8
Total votes		2,338	100.0

2022 Hillsborough 33rd New Hampshire House of Representatives Election, General Election
Party	Candidate	Votes	%
Democratic	Jonah Wheeler	2,538	36.0
Democratic	Peter Leishman (incumbent)	2,433	34.5
Republican	Rachel Maidment	1,054	15.0
Republican	Matthew Pilcher	1,020	14.5
Total votes		7,045	100.0

2024 Hillsborough 33rd New Hampshire House of Representatives Election, Democratic primary
Party	Candidate	Votes	%
Democratic	Jonah Wheeler (incumbent)	1,009	37.8
Democratic	Peter Leishman (incumbent)	968	36.3
Democratic	Ivy Vann	690	25.9
Total votes		2,667	100.0

2024 Hillsborough 33rd New Hampshire House of Representatives Election, General Election
Party	Candidate	Votes	%
Democratic	Peter Leishman (incumbent)	2,932	39.6
Democratic	Jonah Wheeler (incumbent)	2,920	39.4
Republican	Kimberly Thomas	1,555	21.0
Total votes		7,407	100.0

2026 Hillsborough 33rd New Hampshire House of Representatives Election, Democratic primary
Party	Candidate	Votes	%
Democratic	Peter Leishman (incumbent)	1,190	43.3
Democratic	Jonah Wheeler (incumbent)	789	28.7
Democratic	Amanda Allen (write-in)	770	28.0
Total votes		2,749	100.0

2026 Hillsborough 33rd New Hampshire House of Representatives Election, General Election
Party	Candidate	Votes	%
