= Joseph Hart (artist) =

American artist

Joseph Hart (born 1976) is an American artist. Originally from Peterborough, New Hampshire, he currently lives and works in Brooklyn, New York.

His work has recently been exhibited at Romer Young Gallery in San Francisco, Dieu Donne, David Krut Projects and Halsey Mckay Gallery in New York, among others. Hart's work has also been included in notable group shows at the Frans Masareel Center in Belgium, Bronx Museum of the Arts and the Santa Monica Museum of Art. He has been featured in periodicals such as FlashArt, Modern Painters, Huffington Post and The New York Times. His work is in the public collections of The Rhode Island School of Design Museum, The Metropolitan Museum of Art and the San Francisco Museum of Modern Art. Hart received a BFA from the Rhode Island School of Design in 1999.

== Solo & Two Person Exhibitions ==
- 2014 Joseph Hart & Tamara Zahaykevich, Dieu Donne, New York, NY
- 2014 Dread Blush, David Krut Projects, New York, NY
- 2014 Excavator, Romer Young Gallery, San Francisco, CA
- 2013 Angel Error, Halsey Mckay Gallery, East Hampton, NY
- 2013 Delong & Hart, Cooper Cole Gallery, Toronto, Canada
- 2012 Odd Antique, Halsey Mckay at The New York Design Center, New York, NY
- 2011 Joseph Hart & Ruby Sky Stiler, Halsey Mckay Gallery, East Hampton, NY
- 2010 Out of Moments, Galerie Vidal Saint-Phalle, Paris, France
- 2009 Stagecrafter, David Krut Projects, New York, NY
- 2007 Beautiful Balance, Galerie Vidal Saint-Phalle, Paris, France
- 2006 Belief Signal, Galleri Loyal, Stockholm, Sweden

== Selected group exhibitions ==
- 2014 Winter Show, Gallery Steinsland Berliner, Stockholm, Sweden
- 2014 Volatile, Galleri Jacob Bjorn, Aarhus, Denmark
- 2013 News from New York, Galleri Tom Christoffersen, Copenhagen, Denmark
- 2012 Finders Keepers, Frederieke Taylor Gallery at TSA, Brooklyn, NY
- 2012 Sixth Sax, Halsey Mckay Gallery, East Hampton, NY
- 2011 Go Figure, Dodge Gallery, New York, NY
- 2011 Incognito, Santa Monica Museum of Art, Santa Monica, CA
- 2011 Cover Version LP, Brooklyn Academy of Music, Brooklyn, NY
- 2010 New New York, Frans Masereel Center, Kasterlee, Belgium
- 2010 Default State Network, Morgan Lehman Gallery, New York, NY
- 2010 All This and Not Ordinary, Jeff Bailey Gallery, New York, NY
- 2009 New Prints / Summer 2009, International Print Center, New York, NY
- 2009 Subverted Genres, Sue Scott Gallery, New York, NY
- 2009 With Hidden Noise, David Krut Projects, New York, NY
- 2008 New Editions / Forth Estate, Klaus Von Nichtssagend Gallery, Brooklyn, NY
- 2008 Cover Version, Taylor De Cordoba, Los Angeles, CA
- 2008 New Talents, Art Cologne, Cologne, Germany
- 2008 Accident Blackspot, Galerie Markus Winter, Berlin, Germany
- 2007 Work In Progress, Galleri Magnus Aklundh, Malmo, Sweden
- 2007 Here And Elsewhere, The Bronx Museum of The Arts, NY
- 2006 Forth Estate Editions, Klaus Von Nichtssangend Gallery, Brooklyn, NY
- 2006 CRG Presents / Klaus Gallery, CRG Gallery, New York, NY
- 2006 You Have To Be Almost Gifted To Do What I Do, Alexander & Bonin, New York, NY
- 2006 Don't Abandon Ship, Allston Skirt Gallery, Boston, MA
- 2005 Selected Drawings, Klaus Von Nichtssangend, Brooklyn, NY
- 2005 Loyal And His Band, Galleri Loyal, Stockholm, Sweden
- 2005 Greater Brooklyn, CRG Gallery, NYC

== Awards and honors ==
- 2014, Residency Fellowship, Dieu Donne, New York, NY
- 2010, Juror, Robert Blackburn Printmaking Workshop / Studio Immersion Project, New York, NY
- 2010, Guest Lecture, Northeastern University / Dept. of Art & Design, Boston, MA
- 2009, Guest Lecture, Maryland Institute College of Art, Baltimore, MD
- 2009, North American Print Biennial, Selected Artist, Boston University, Boston, MA
- 2008, Selected Artist, Art Cologne / New Talents, Cologne, Germany
- 2008, Juror, Scholastic Art Awards / Division of Printmaking and Drawing, New York, NY
- 2007, Selected Artist, AIM Program / The Bronx Museum of the Arts, Bronx, NY
- 2006, Guest Lecture, Harvard University / Advocate Arts Presents, Cambridge, MA
- 2005, Residency Fellowship, Saltonstall Foundation for The Arts, Ithaca, NY

== Selected bibliography ==
- Miyazaki, Naoto, MONTEM Magazine #04, September, 2014
- Quicho, Alex, Free Thinkers #07, September, 2014
- Osberg, Annabel, "Kiss Idioms", Huffington Post, May, 2014
- de Cherico, Domenico, Dust Magazine, May, 2014
- Hamer Diamond, Katy, "New York Tales / Angel Error", Flash Art, August, 2013
- Russeth, Andrew, "Miami Project Arrives", Gallerist NY, 2012
- Indrisek, Scott, "Young Blood", Modern Painters, June, 2011
- Valli, Marc, "In The Broadest Sense", Elephant Magazine #5, January, 2011
- Morton, Julia, "Default State Network", City Arts, July, 2010
- Rich, Matthew, "Joseph Hart, and You", Stagecraft Catalogue, November, 2009
- McCrickard, Kate, "History Boy", Stagecraft Catalogue, November, 2009
- Hartig, Frederik, Das Gefrorene Meer No. 4, 2008
- Hendeson, Lee, "Bilocation", Border Crossing Issue #107, 2008
- Chu, Ingrid, "Accident Blackspot", Time Out New York, August, 2008
- Stern, Steven, "Joseph Hart / Fragments", Seems Books, July, 2008
- Loesser, Ernest, "Where The Pieces Fall", FV Magazine Vol. 2, 2008
- Ribas, Joao, "The Reeducation Of The Un-Artist", Here And Elsewhere catalogue, April, 2007
- Brown, Nick, "The Art of Storytelling", COLOR Magazine, October, 2006
- Stockwell, Craig, "Young Mountain", Art New England, October, 2005
- Alessandrelli, Irina Zucca, "La risposta di Brooklyn alla Grande NY", Flash Art, August, 2005
- Martin, Kristian, Amy, "Loyal And His Band", Loyal Books Vol.1, March, 2005
