= Hypsodontinae =

Hypsodontinae Temporal range: Miocene

Scientific classification
- Domain: Eukaryota
- Kingdom: Animalia
- Phylum: Chordata
- Class: Mammalia
- Order: Artiodactyla
- Family: Bovidae
- Subfamily: †Hypsodontinae; Köhler, 1987

Genera
- †Gobiocerus; †Hypsodontus; †Kubanotragus; †Sinopalaeoceros

Extinct subfamily of bovid

Hypsodontinae is an extinct subfamily of Bovidae. They are considered the earliest members of the family, first appearing in the earliest part of the Miocene. The group may be diphyletic in relation to other members of the family.
