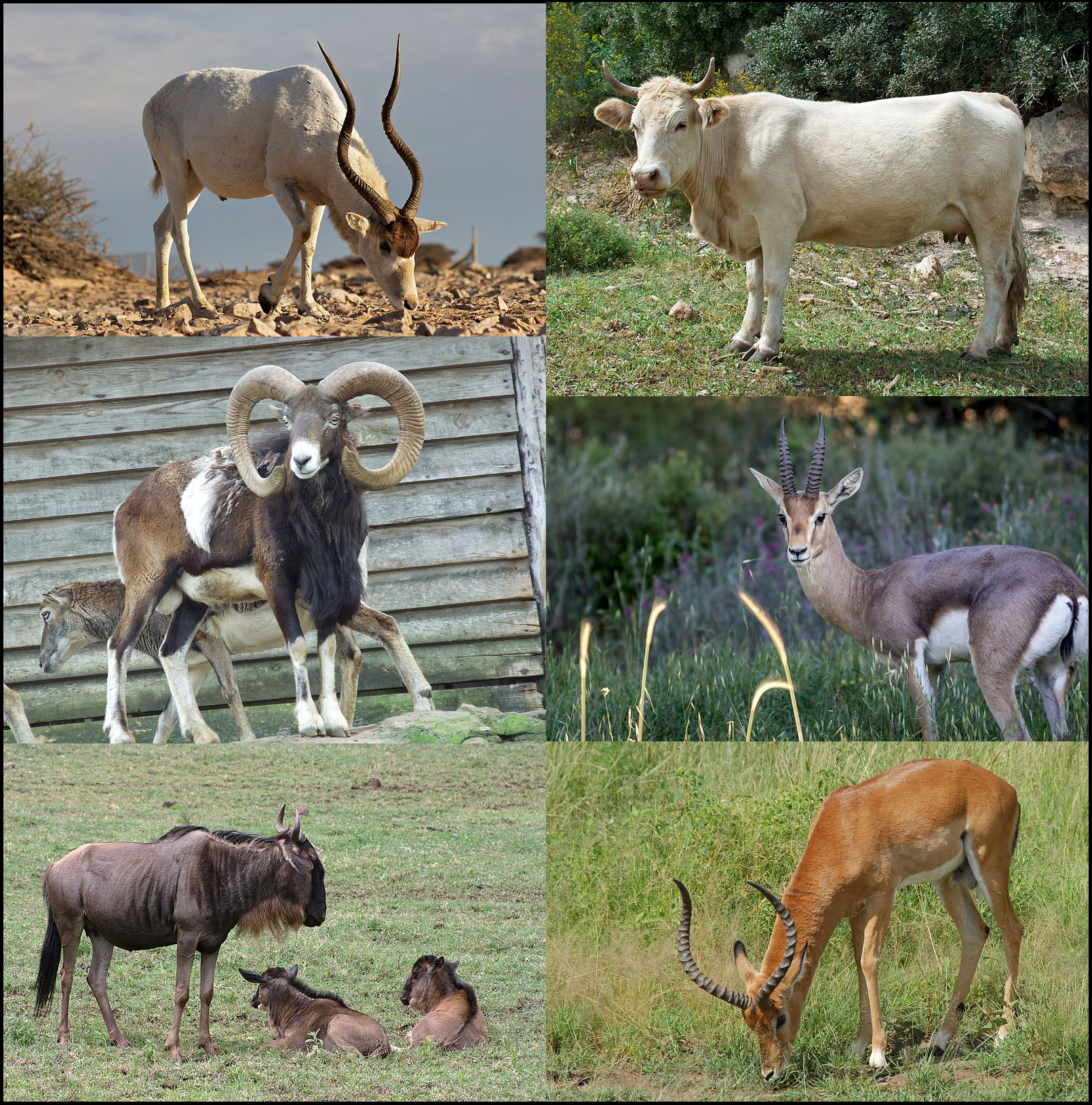
- Example Bovidae (clockwise from top left) – addax (Addax nasomaculatus), domestic cattle (Bos taurus), mountain gazelle (Gazella gazella), impala (Aepyceros melampus), blue wildebeest (Connochaetes taurinus), and mouflons (Ovis gmelini)

Scientific classification
- Kingdom: Animalia
- Phylum: Chordata
- Class: Mammalia
- Order: Artiodactyla
- Superfamily: Bovoidea
- Family: Bovidae; Gray, 1821

Type genus
- Bos Linnaeus, 1758

Subfamilies
- Aepycerotinae (1 genus); Alcelaphinae (4 genera); Antilopinae (3 tribes and 14 genera); Bovinae (3 tribes and 15 genera); Caprinae (3 tribes and 15 genera); Cephalophinae (3 genera); Hippotraginae (3 genera); Nesotraginae (1 genus); Oreotraginae (1 genus); Reduncinae (3 genera); †Hypsodontinae; Alternate taxonomy: Antilopinae (10 tribes and 45 genera); Bovinae (3 tribes and 15 genera); †Hypsodontinae
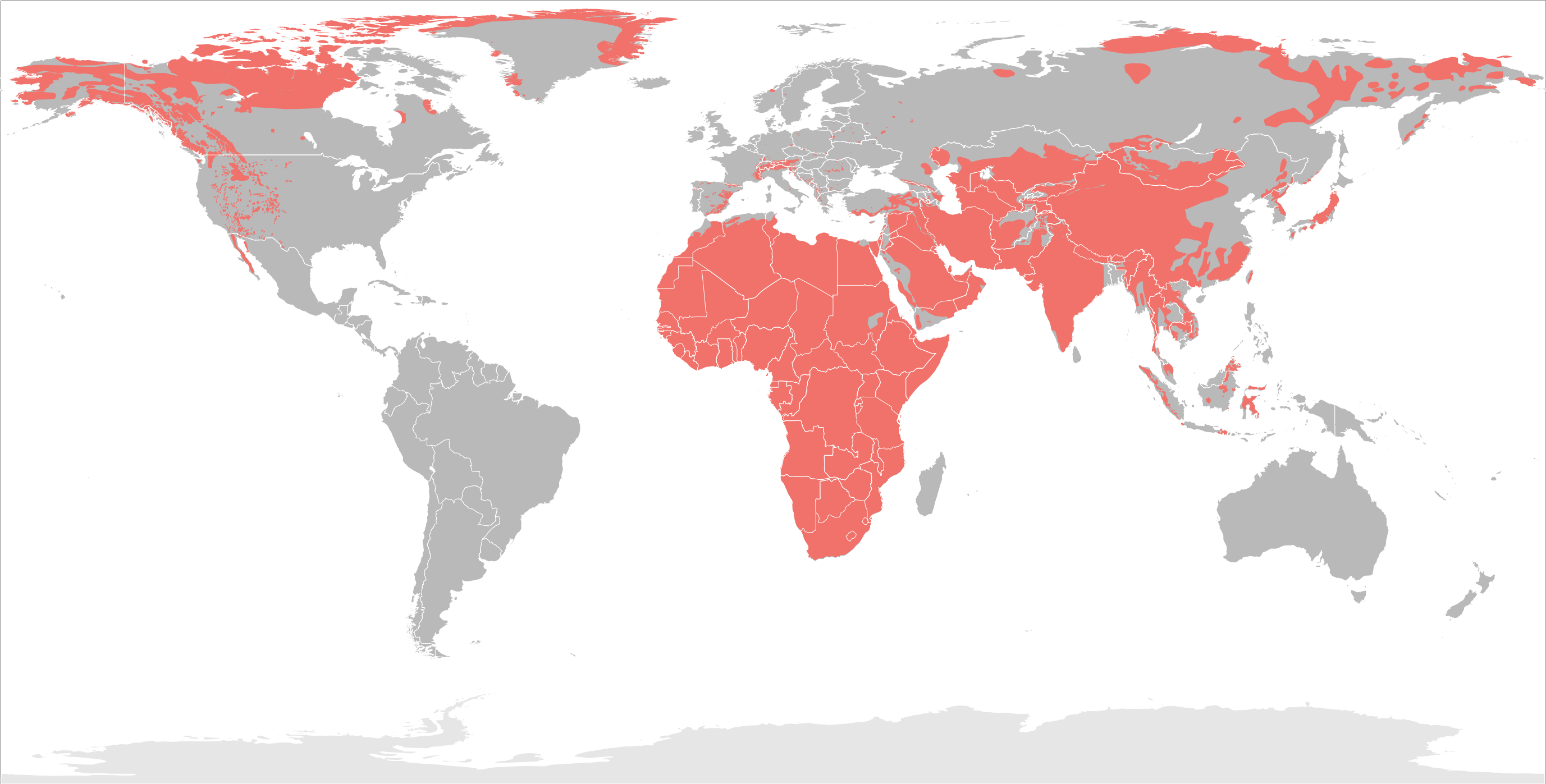
- Bovidae distribution

= Bovidae =

Bovidae Temporal range: 20–0 Ma Early Miocene present

Family of mammals belonging to even-toed ungulates

Bovidae is the biological family of cloven-hoofed, ruminant mammals that includes cattle, bison, buffalo, antelopes, and goat-antelopes such as sheep and goats. There are 143 extant species and 300 known extinct species of bovids, which are divided into either 11 major subfamilies, or two subfamilies with 13 tribes. The earliest known bovid had evolved by 20 million years ago, in the early Miocene.

The bovids show great variation in size and colouration of their fur. With exceptions in some domesticated forms, all male bovids have two or more horns, and in many species, females possess horns too. The size and shape of the horns vary greatly, but the basic structure is always one or more pairs of simple, unbranched, bony protrusions of the skull covered in a permanent sheath of keratin, and often with a spiral, twisted, or fluted shape, Most bovids bear 30 to 32 teeth.

Most bovids are diurnal: social activity and feeding usually peak during dawn and dusk. Bovids typically rest before dawn, during midday, and after dark. They have various methods of social organisation and social behaviour, which are classified into solitary and gregarious behaviour. Bovids use different forms of vocal, olfactory, and tangible communication. Most species alternately feed and ruminate throughout the day. While small bovids forage in dense and closed habitat, larger species feed on high-fiber vegetation in open grasslands. Most bovids are polygynous. Mature bovids mate at least once a year and smaller species may even mate twice. In some species, newborn or neonate bovids remain hidden for a week to two months, regularly nursed by their mothers; in other species, neonates are followers, accompanying their travelling mothers shortly after birth.

The greatest diversities of Bovidae occur in Africa. The maximum concentration of species is in the savannas of Eastern Africa. Other bovid species also occur in Europe, Asia, and North America. A number of bovid species are domesticated, including three whose use has spread worldwide, these being the cattle, sheep, and goats. Dairy products, such as milk, butter, and cheese, are manufactured largely from domestic cattle. Bovids are also raised for their leather, meat, and wool.

== Naming and etymology ==
The name Bovidae was coined by the British zoologist John Edward Gray in 1821. It is composed of the prefix bov- (originating from Latin bos 'ox', through Late Latin bovinus) and the suffix -idae.

== Taxonomy ==
The family Bovidae is placed in the order Artiodactyla, the even-toed ungulates. It includes 143 extant species, accounting for nearly 55% of ungulate diversity, and 300 known extinct species.

Until the beginning of the 21st century it was understood that the family of musk deer (Moschidae) was sister to Cervidae, the family of antlered deer. However, a 2003 phylogenetic study by Alexandre Hassanin (of National Museum of Natural History, France) and colleagues, based on mitochondrial and nuclear analyses, revealed that Moschidae and Bovidae form a clade which is sister to Cervidae. According to the study, Cervidae diverged from the Bovidae-Moschidae clade 27 to 28 million years ago. The following cladogram is based on the 2003 study.

- Ruminantia
  - Tragulina
    - Tragulidae
  - Pecora
    - Antilocapridae
    - Giraffidae
    - - Cervidae
      - - Moschidae
        - Bovidae

Molecular studies have supported monophyly in the family Bovidae; it is a "natural group" containing an ancestral species and all of their descendants. The number of subfamilies in Bovidae is disputed, with suggestions of as many as ten and as few as two subfamilies. However, molecular, morphological and fossil evidence indicates the existence of eight distinct subfamilies: Aepycerotinae (consisting of just the impala), Alcelaphinae (bontebok, hartebeest, wildebeest and relatives), Antilopinae (several antelopes, gazelles, and relatives), Bovinae (cattle, buffaloes, bison and other antelopes), Caprinae (goats, sheep, ibex, serows and relatives), Cephalophinae (duikers), Hippotraginae (addax, oryx and relatives) and Reduncinae (reedbuck and kob antelopes). In addition, three extinct subfamilies are known: Hypsodontinae (mid-Miocene), Oiocerinae (Turolian) and the subfamily Tethytraginae, which contains Tethytragus (mid-Miocene).

In 1992 Alan W. Gentry of the Natural History Museum, London divided the eight major subfamilies of Bovidae into two major clades on the basis of their evolutionary history: the Boodontia, which comprised only the Bovinae, and the Aegodontia, which consisted of the rest of the subfamilies. Boodonts have somewhat primitive teeth, resembling those of oxen, whereas aegodonts have more advanced teeth like those of goats.

A controversy exists about the recognition of Peleinae and Pantholopinae, comprising the genera Pelea and Pantholops respectively, as subfamilies. In 2000, American biologist George Schaller and palaeontologist Elisabeth Vrba suggested the inclusion of Pelea in Reduncinae, though the grey rhebok, the sole species of Pelea, is highly different from kobs and reduncines in morphology. Pantholops, earlier classified in the Antilopinae, was later placed in its own subfamily, Pantholopinae. However, molecular and morphological analysis supports the inclusion of Pantholops in Caprinae.

Below is a cladogram based on Yang et al., 2013 and Calamari, 2021:

- Bovidae
  - Boodontia (Bovinae)
    - - Bovini (bison, buffalo, cattle, etc.)
    - - Boselaphini (nilgai and four-horned antelope)
      - Tragelaphini (kudus, nyalas etc.)
  - Aegodontia
    - - Aepycerotinae (impala)
      - Nesotraginae (suni and bates's antelope)
    - - - Antilopinae (gazelles, springbok, dik-dik, royal antelope, saiga, etc.)
        - - Cephalophinae (duikers etc.)
          - Oreotraginae (klipspringer)
      - - Reduncinae (kobs, reedbucks, waterbucks etc.)
        - - Caprinae (chamois, sheep, ibexes, goats, muskox, etc.)
          - - Alcelaphinae (hartebeest, topi, wildebeest etc.)
            - Hippotraginae (sable antelopes, oryxes etc.)

Alternatively, all members of the Aegodontia can be classified within the subfamily Antilopinae, with the individual subfamilies being tribes in this treatment.

== Evolutionary history ==
=== Early Miocene and before ===
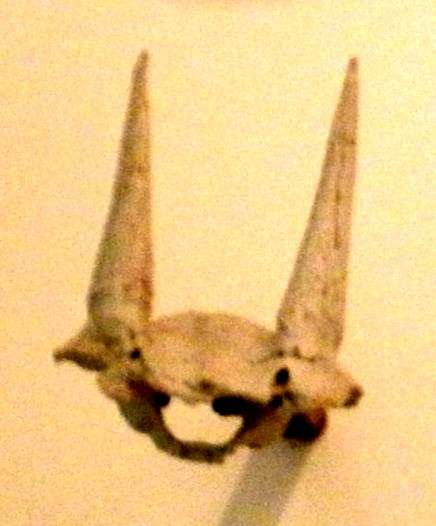
Skull of Eotragus sansaniensis, a species of the ancient bovid genus Eotragus

In the early Miocene, bovids began diverging from the cervids (deer) and giraffids. The earliest bovids, whose presence in Africa and Eurasia in the latter part of early Miocene (20 Mya) has been ascertained, were small animals, somewhat similar to modern gazelles, and probably lived in woodland environments. Eotragus, the earliest known bovid, weighed 18 kg (40 lb) and was nearly the same in size as the Thomson's gazelle. Early in their evolutionary history, the bovids split into two main clades: Boodontia (of Eurasian origin) and Aegodontia (of African origin). This early split between Boodontia and Aegodontia has been attributed to the continental divide between these land masses. When these continents were later rejoined, this barrier was removed, and both groups expanded into the territory of the other. The tribes Bovini and Tragelaphini diverged in the early Miocene. Bovids are known to have reached the Americas in the Pleistocene by crossing the Bering land bridge.

The present genera of Alcelaphinae appeared in the Pliocene. The extinct Alcelaphine genus Paramularius, which was the same in size as the hartebeest, is believed to have come into being in the Pliocene, but became extinct in the middle Pleistocene. Several genera of Hippotraginae are known since the Pliocene and Pleistocene. This subfamily appears to have diverged from the Alcelaphinae in the latter part of early Miocene. The Bovinae are believed to have diverged from the rest of the Bovidae in the early Miocene. The Boselaphini became extinct in Africa in the early Pliocene; their latest fossils were excavated in Langebaanweg (South Africa) and Lothagam (Kenya).

=== Middle Miocene ===
The middle Miocene marked the spread of the bovids into China and the Indian subcontinent. According to Vrba, the radiation of the subfamily Alcelaphinae began in the latter part of middle Miocene. The Caprinae tribes probably diverged in the early middle Miocene. The Caprini emerged in the middle Miocene, and seem to have been replaced by other bovids and cervids in Eurasia. The earliest fossils of the antilopines are from the middle Miocene, though studies show the existence of the subfamily from the early Miocene. Speciation occurred in the tribe Antilopini during the middle or upper Miocene, mainly in Eurasia. Tribe Neotragini seems to have appeared in Africa by the end of Miocene, and had become widespread by the Pliocene.

=== Late Miocene ===
By the late Miocene, around 10 Mya, the bovids rapidly diversified, leading to the creation of 70 new genera. This late Miocene radiation was partly because many bovids became adapted to more open, grassland habitats. The Aepycerotinae first appeared in the late Miocene, and no significant difference in the sizes of the primitive and modern impala has been noted. Fossils of ovibovines, a tribe of Caprinae, in Africa date back to the late Miocene. The earliest Hippotragine fossils date back to the late Miocene, and were excavated from sites such as Lothagam and Awash Valley. The first African fossils of Reduncinae date back to 6–7 Mya. Reduncinae and Peleinae probably diverged in the mid-Miocene.

=== Plio-Pleistocene ===
African bovids continued becoming more adapted to mixed feeding, indicated by dental mesowear evidence, as their palaeoenvironment opened up.

== Characteristics ==
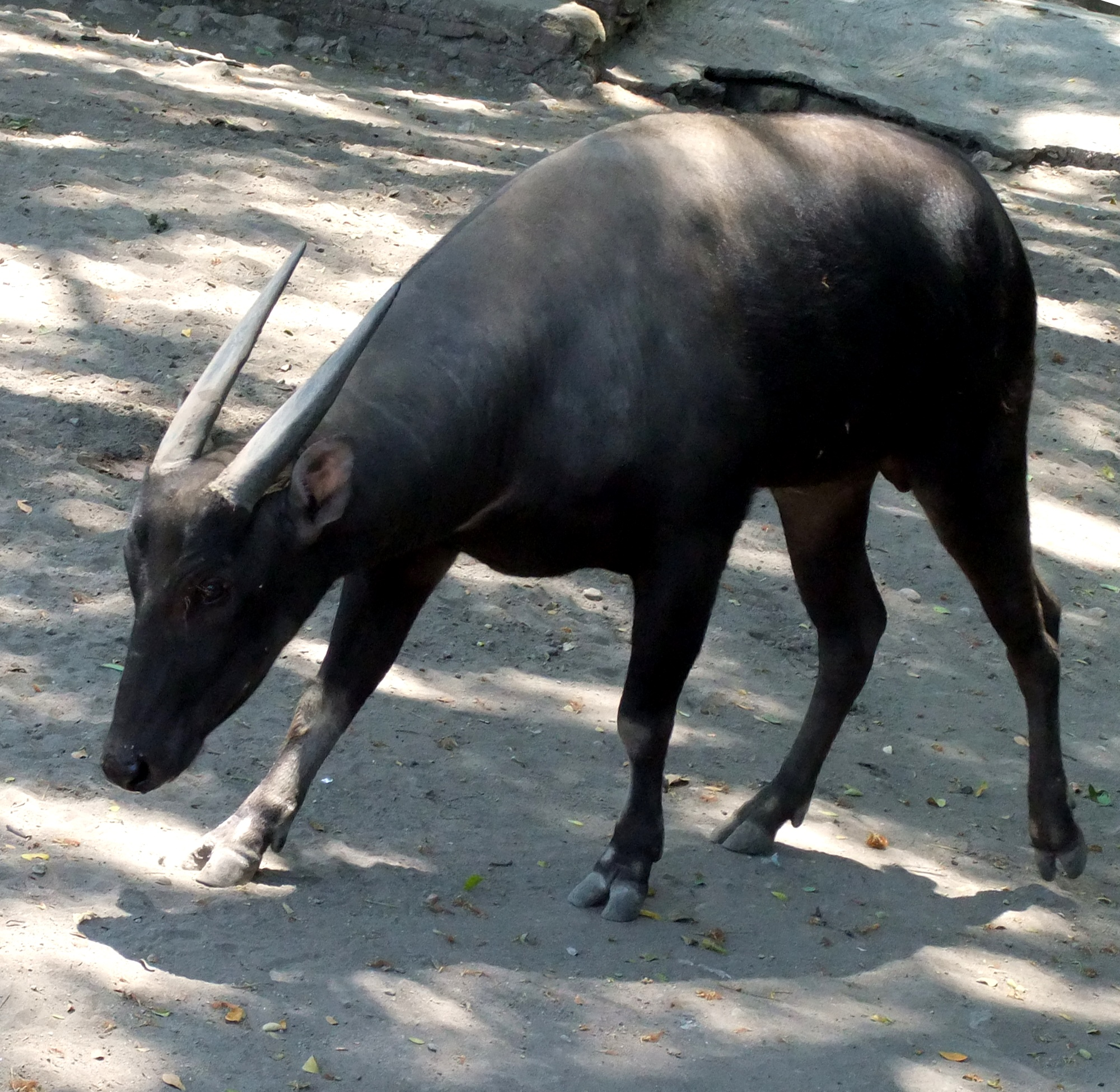
The anoa, a dwarf species of buffalo, has a dark pelage

All bovids have the similar basic form – a snout with a blunt tip, one or more pairs of horns (generally present on males) immediately after the oval or pointed ears, a distinct neck and limbs, and a tail varying in length and bushiness among the species. Most bovids exhibit sexual dimorphism, with males usually larger as well as heavier than females. Sexual dimorphism is more prominent in medium- to large-sized bovids. All bovids have four toes on each foot – they walk on the central two (the hooves), while the outer two (the dewclaws) are much smaller and rarely touch the ground.

The bovids show great variation in size: the gaur can weigh more than 1,500 kg (3,300 lb), and stand 2.2 m (87 in) high at the shoulder. The royal antelope, in sharp contrast, is only 25 cm (9.8 in) tall and weighs at most 3 kg (6.6 lb). The klipspringer, another small antelope, stands 45–60 cm (18–24 in) at the shoulder and weighs just 10–20 kg (22–44 lb).

Differences occur in pelage colouration, ranging from a pale white (as in the Arabian oryx) to black (as in the black wildebeest). However, only the intermediate shades, such as brown and reddish brown (as in the reedbuck), are commonly observed. In several species, females and juveniles exhibit a light-coloured coat, while those of males darken with age. As in the wildebeest, the coat may be marked with prominent or faint stripes. In some species such as the addax, the coat colour can vary by the season. Scent glands and sebaceous glands are often present.

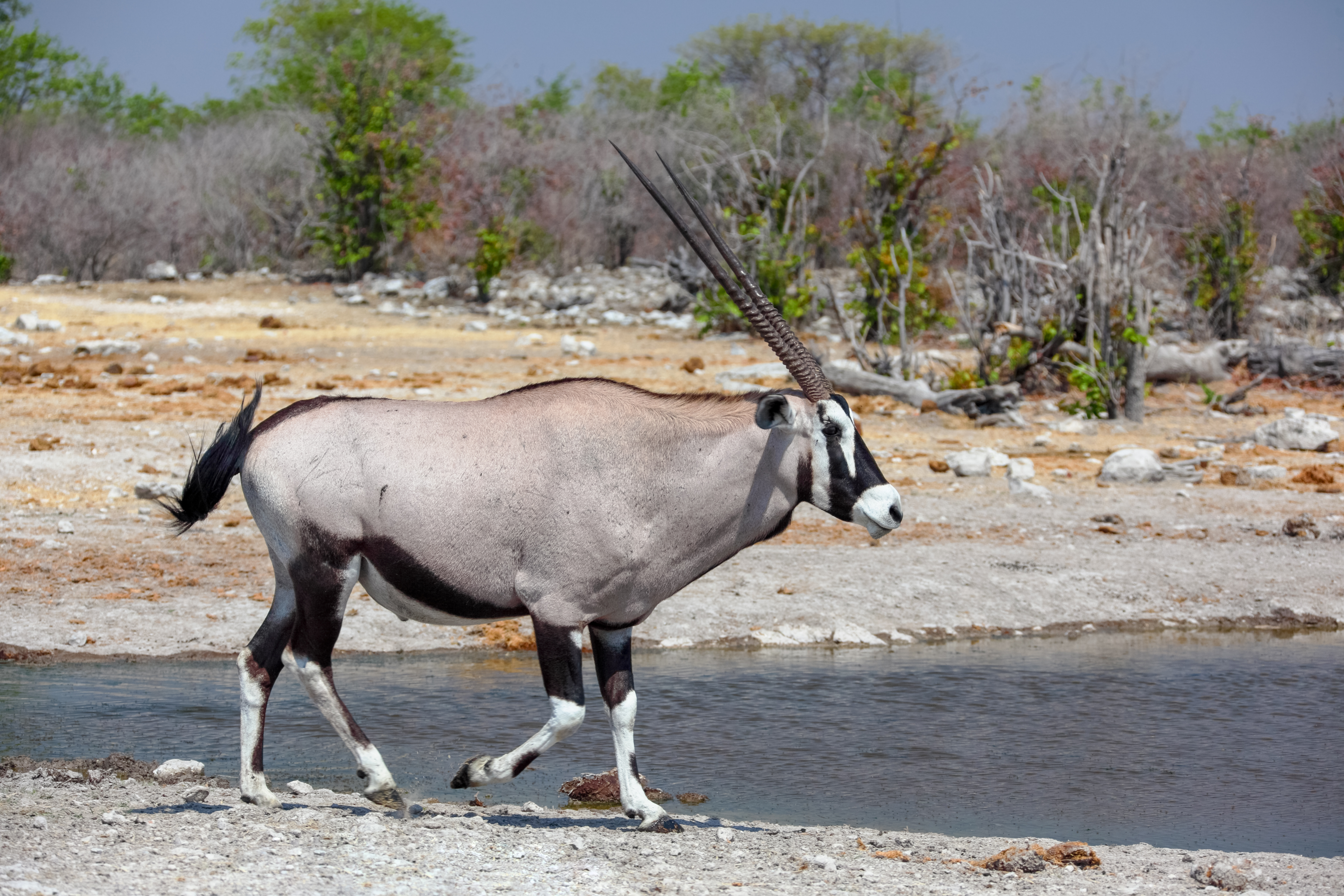
The gemsbok has conspicuous markings on its face, which conceal the eye, and on its legs. These may have a role in communication.

Some species, such as the gemsbok, sable antelope, and Grant's gazelle, are camouflaged with strongly disruptive facial markings that conceal the highly recognisable eye. Many species, such as gazelles, may be made to look flat through countershading, hence blending into the background. The outlines of many bovids are broken up with bold disruptive colouration, the strongly contrasting patterns helping to delay recognition by predators. However, all the Hippotraginae (including the gemsbok) have pale bodies and faces with conspicuous markings. The zoologist Tim Caro describes this as difficult to explain, but given that the species are diurnal, he suggests that the markings may function in communication. Strongly contrasting leg colouration is common only in the Bovidae, where for example Bos, Ovis, bontebok and gemsbok have white stockings. Again, communication is the likely function.

Excepting some domesticated forms, all male bovids have horns, and in many species, females too possess horns. The size and shape of the horns vary greatly, but the basic structure is a pair of simple bony protrusions without branches, often having a spiral, twisted, or fluted form, each covered in a permanent sheath of keratin. Although horns occur in a single pair on almost all bovid species, there are exceptions such as the four-horned antelope and the Jacob sheep. The unique horn structure is the only unambiguous morphological feature of bovids that distinguishes them from other pecorans. A high correlation exists between horn morphology and fighting behaviour of the individual. For instance, long horns are intended for wrestling and fencing, whereas curved horns are used in ramming. Males with horns directed inwards are monogamous and solitary, while those with horns directed outwards tend to be polygynous. These results were independent of body size.

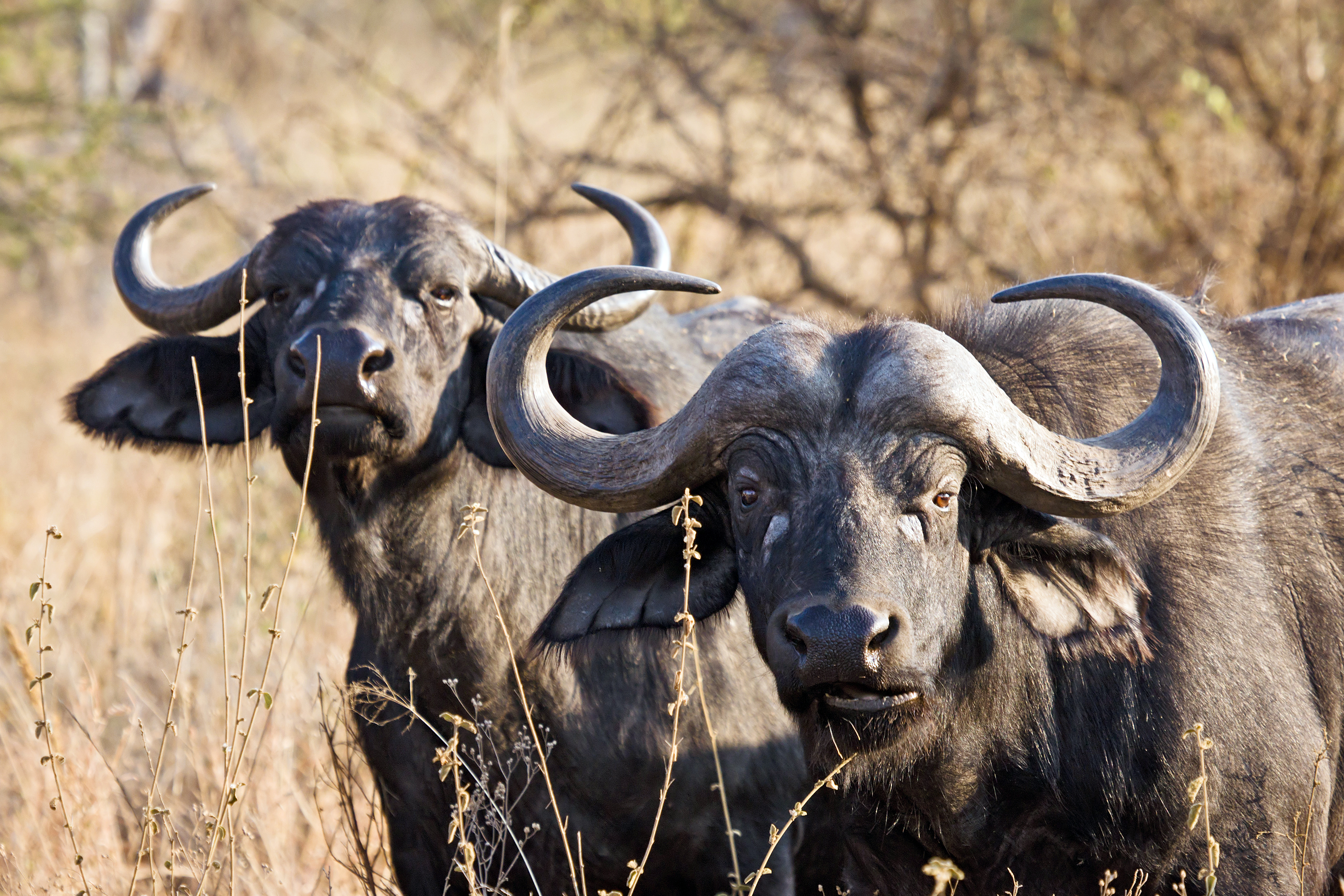
The horns of African buffalo are hooked

Male horn development has been linked to sexual selection, Horns are small spikes in the monogamous duikers and other small antelopes, whereas in the polygynous, they are large and elaborately formed (for example in a spiral structure, as in the giant eland). Thus, to some extent, horns depict the degree of competition among males in a species. However, the presence of horns in females is likely due to natural selection. The horns of females are usually smaller than those of males, and are sometimes of a different shape. The horns of female bovids are believed to have evolved for defence against predators or to express territoriality, as non-territorial females, which are able to use crypsis for predator defence, often do not have horns. Females possess horns only in half of the bovid genera, and females in these genera are heavier than those in the rest. Females use horns mainly for stabbing.

=== Anatomy ===
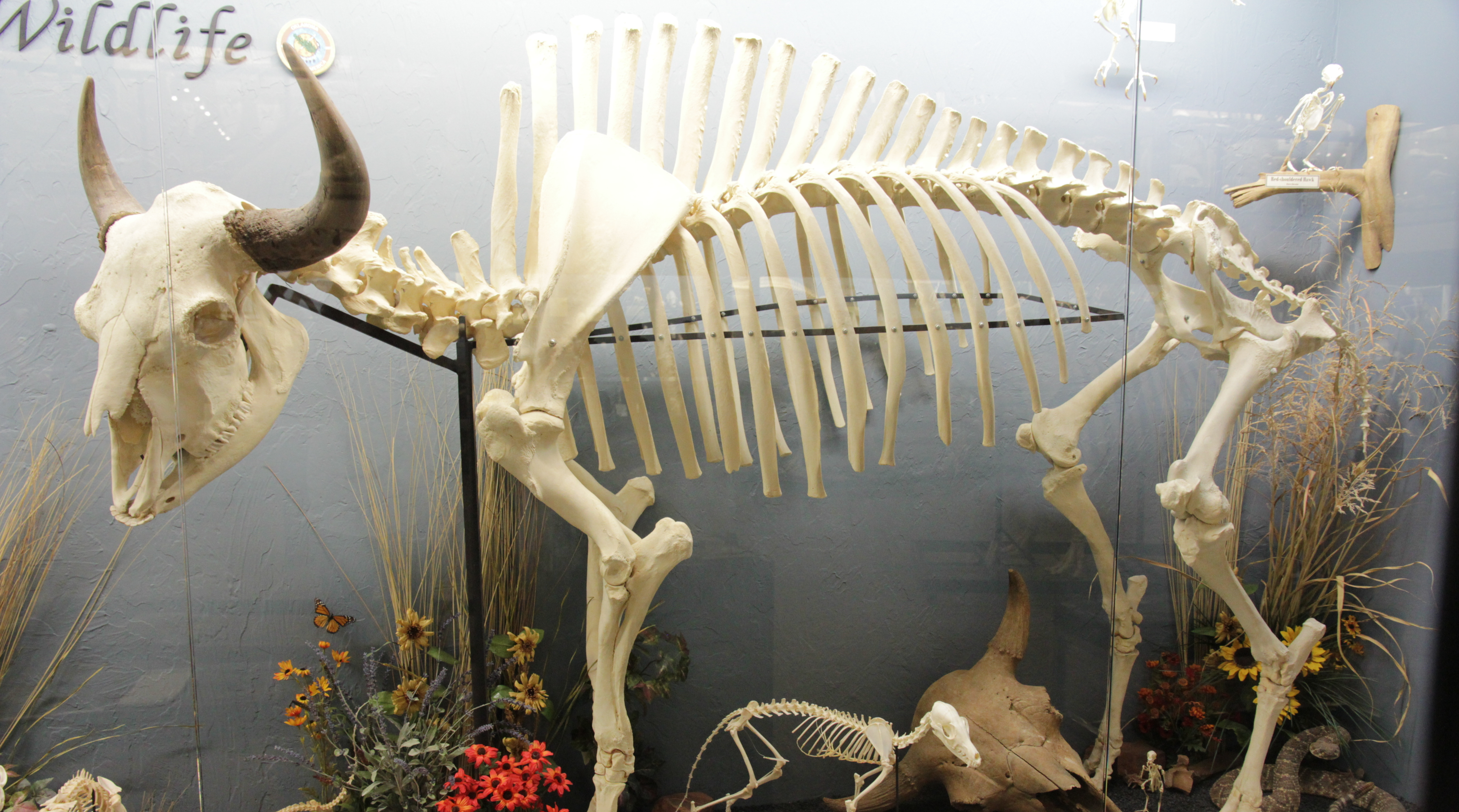
American bison skeleton (Museum of Osteology)

In bovids, the third and fourth metapodials are combined into the cannon bone. The ulna and fibula are reduced, and fused with the radius and tibia, respectively. Long scapulae are present, whereas the clavicles are absent. Being ruminants, the stomach is composed of four chambers: the rumen (80%), the omasum, the reticulum, and the abomasum. The ciliates and bacteria of the rumen ferment the complex cellulose into simpler fatty acids, which are then absorbed through the rumen wall. Bovids have a long small intestine; the length of the small intestine in cattle is 29–49 m (95–161 ft). Body temperature fluctuates through the day; for instance, in goats the temperature can change slightly from nearly 37 °C (99 °F) in the early morning to 40 °C (104 °F) in the afternoon. Temperature is regulated through sweating in cattle, whereas goats use panting for the same. The right lung, consisting of four to five lobes, is around 1.5 times larger than the left, which has three lobes.

=== Dentition ===
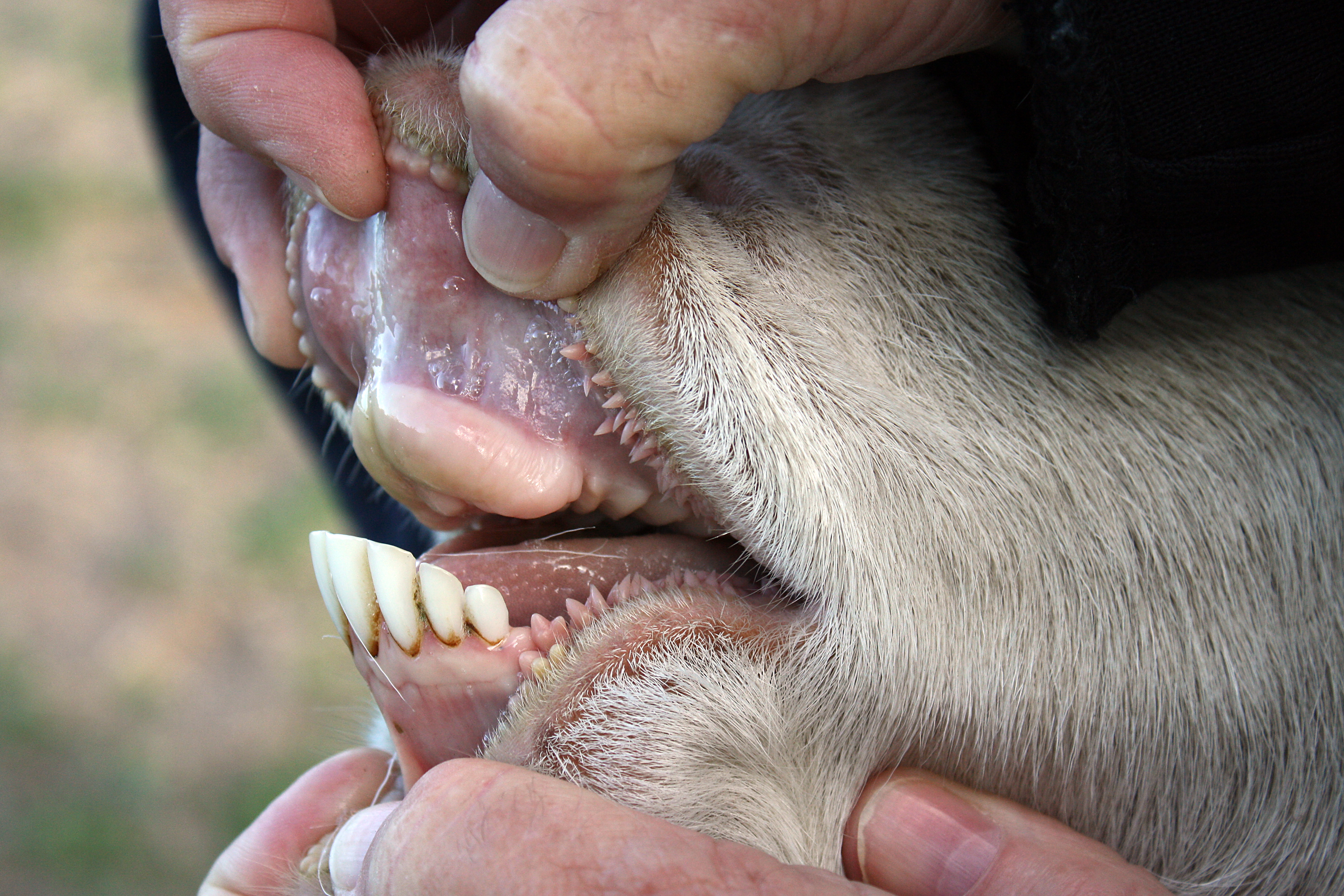
Dental pad of a domestic bovid: Note the absence of upper incisors and canines and the outward projection of the lower teeth.

Most bovids bear 30 to 32 teeth. While the upper incisors are absent, the upper canines are either reduced or absent. Instead of the upper incisors, bovids have a thick and tough layer of tissue, called the dental pad, that provides a surface to grip grasses and foliage. They are hypsodont and selenodont, since the molars and premolars are low-crowned and crescent-shaped cusps. The lower incisors and canines project forward. The incisors are followed by a long toothless gap, known as the diastema. The general dental formula for bovids is 0.0.2-3.33.1.3.3. Most members of the family are herbivorous, but most duikers are omnivorous. Like other ruminants, bovids have four-chambered stomachs, which allow them to digest plant material, such as grass, that cannot be used by many other animals. Ruminants (and some others like kangaroos, rabbits, and termites) are able to use micro-organisms living in their guts to break down cellulose by fermentation.

== Ecology and behaviour ==
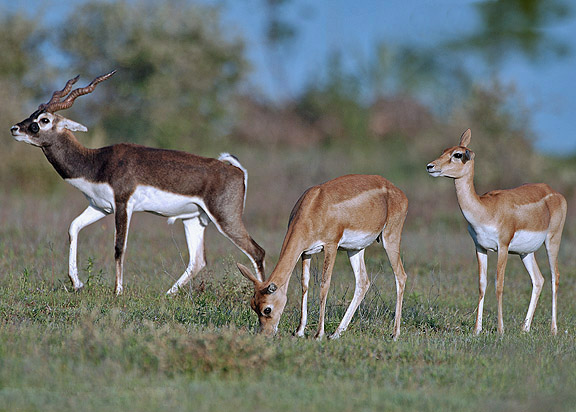
Blackbuck antelopes

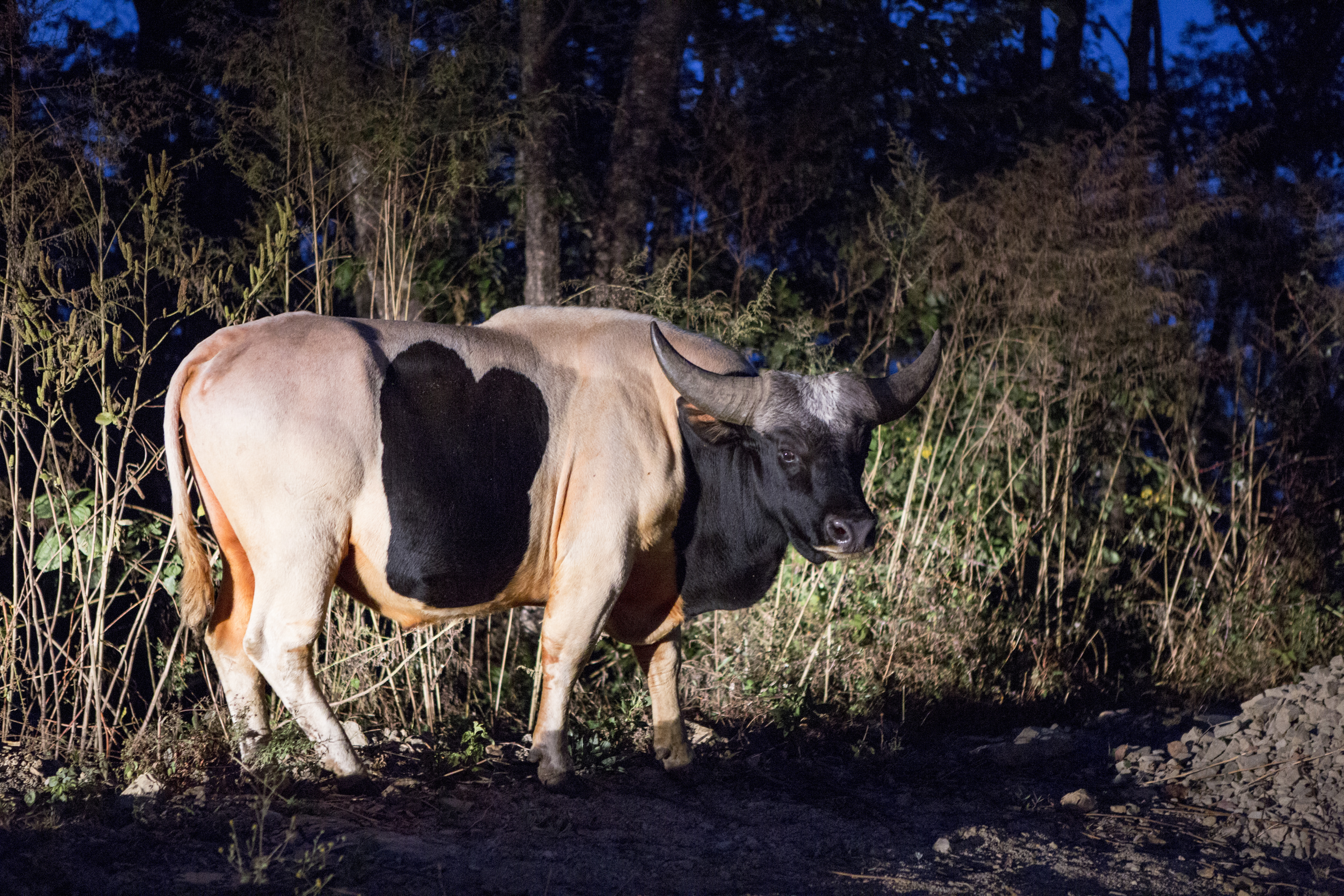
A gayal bull from India and Burma

The bovids have various methods of social organisation and social behaviour, which are classified into solitary and gregarious behaviour. Further, these types may each be divided into territorial and non-territorial behaviour. Small bovids such as the klipspringer, oribi, and steenbok are generally solitary and territorial. They hold small territories into which other members of the species are not allowed to enter. These antelopes form monogamous pairs. Many species such as the dik-dik use pheromone secretions from the preorbital glands and sometimes dung, as well, to mark their territories. The offspring disperse at the time of adolescence, and males must acquire territories prior to mating. The bushbuck is the only bovid that is both solitary and not territorial. This antelope hardly displays aggression, and tends to isolate itself or form loose herds, though in a favourable habitat, several bushbuck may be found quite close to one another.

Excluding the cephalophines (duikers), tragelaphines (spiral-horned antelopes) and the neotragines, most African bovids are gregarious and territorial. Males are forced to disperse on attaining sexual maturity, and must form their own territories, while females are not required to do so. Males that do not hold territories form bachelor herds. Competition takes place among males to acquire dominance, and fights tend to be more rigorous in limited rutting seasons. With the exception of migratory males, males generally hold the same territory throughout their lives. In the waterbuck, some male individuals, known as "satellite males", may be allowed into the territories of other males and have to wait till the owner grows old so they may acquire his territory. Lek mating, where males gather together and competitively display to potential mates, is known to exist among topis, kobs, and lechwes. The tragelaphines, cattle, sheep, and goats are gregarious and not territorial. In these species, males must gain absolute dominance over all other males, and fights are not confined to territories. Males, therefore, spend years in body growth.

=== Activity ===
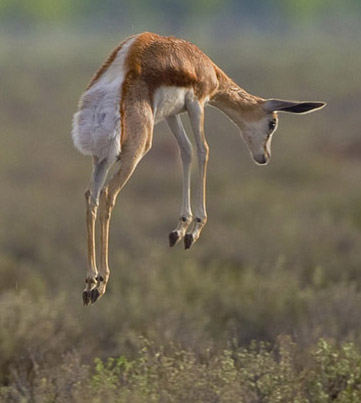
Stotting or pronking by a young springbok signals to predators such as cheetahs that it is a fit and fast individual, not worth chasing.

Most bovids are diurnal, although a few such as the buffalo, bushbuck, reedbuck, and grysbok are exceptions. Social activity and feeding usually peak during dawn and dusk. The bovids usually rest before dawn, during midday, and after dark. Grooming is usually by licking with the tongue. Rarely do antelopes roll in mud or dust. Wildebeest and buffalo usually wallow in mud, whereas the hartebeest and topi rub their heads and horns in mud and then smear it over their bodies. Bovids use different forms of vocal, olfactory, and tangible communication. These involve varied postures of neck, head, horns, hair, legs, and ears to convey sexual excitement, emotional state, or alarm. One such expression is the flehmen response. Bovids usually stand motionless, with the head high and an intent stare, when they sense danger. Some like the impala, kudu, and eland can even leap to heights of a few feet. Bovids may roar or grunt to caution others and warn off predators. Bovids such as gazelles stot or pronk in response to predators, making high leaps on stiff legs, indicating honestly both that the predator has been seen, and that the stotting individual is strong and not worth chasing.

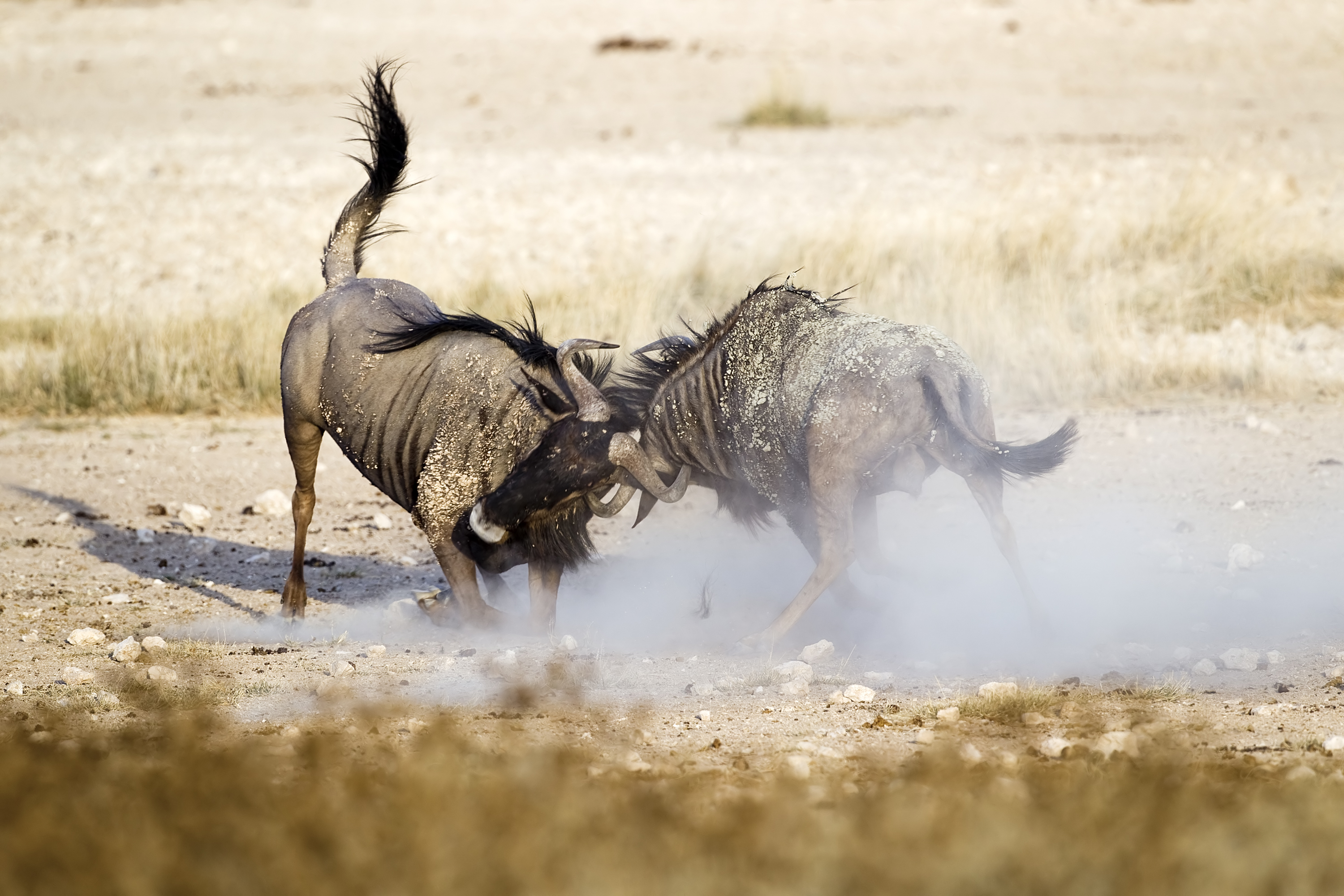
Blue wildebeest

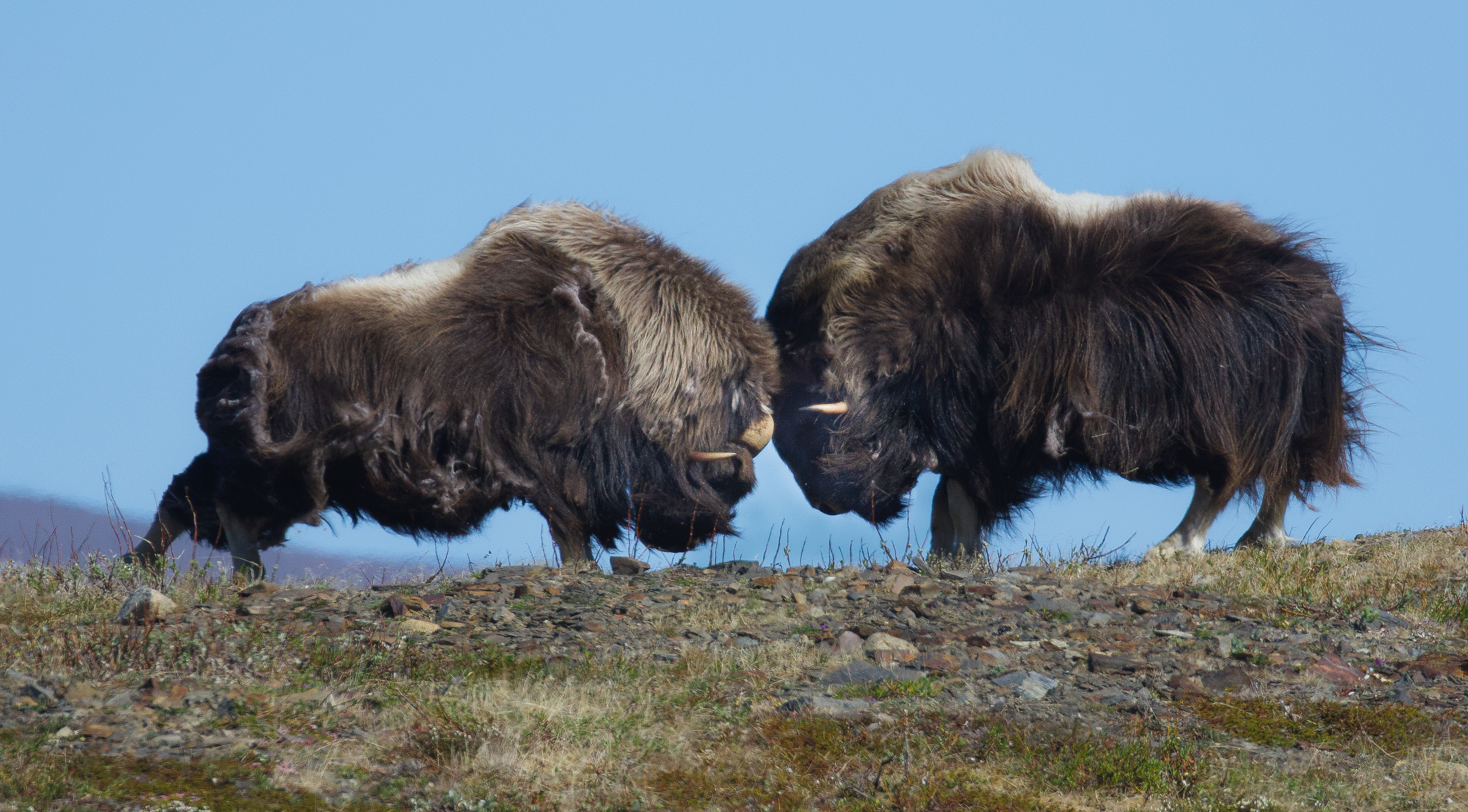
Muskoxen

Fighting bovids

In the mating season, rutting males bellow to make their presence known to females. Muskoxen roar during male-male fights, and male saigas force air through their noses, producing a roar to deter rival males and attract females. Mothers also use vocal communication to locate their calves if they get separated. During fights over dominance, males tend to display themselves in an erect posture with a level muzzle.

Fighting techniques differ amongst the bovid families and also depend on their build. While the hartebeest fight on knees, others usually fight on all fours. Gazelles of various sizes use different methods of combat. Gazelles usually box, and in serious fights may clash and fence, consisting of hard blows from short range. Ibex, goat and sheep males stand upright and clash into each other downward. Wildebeest use powerful head butting in aggressive clashes. If horns become entangled, the opponents move in a circular manner to unlock them. Muskoxen will ram into each other at high speeds. As a rule, only two bovids of equal build and level of defence engage in a fight, which is intended to determine the superior of the two. Individuals that are evidently inferior to others would rather flee than fight; for example, immature males do not fight with the mature bulls. Generally, bovids direct their attacks on the opponent's head rather than its body. The S-shaped horns, such as those on the impala, have various sections that help in ramming, holding, and stabbing. Serious fights leading to injury are rare.

=== Diet ===
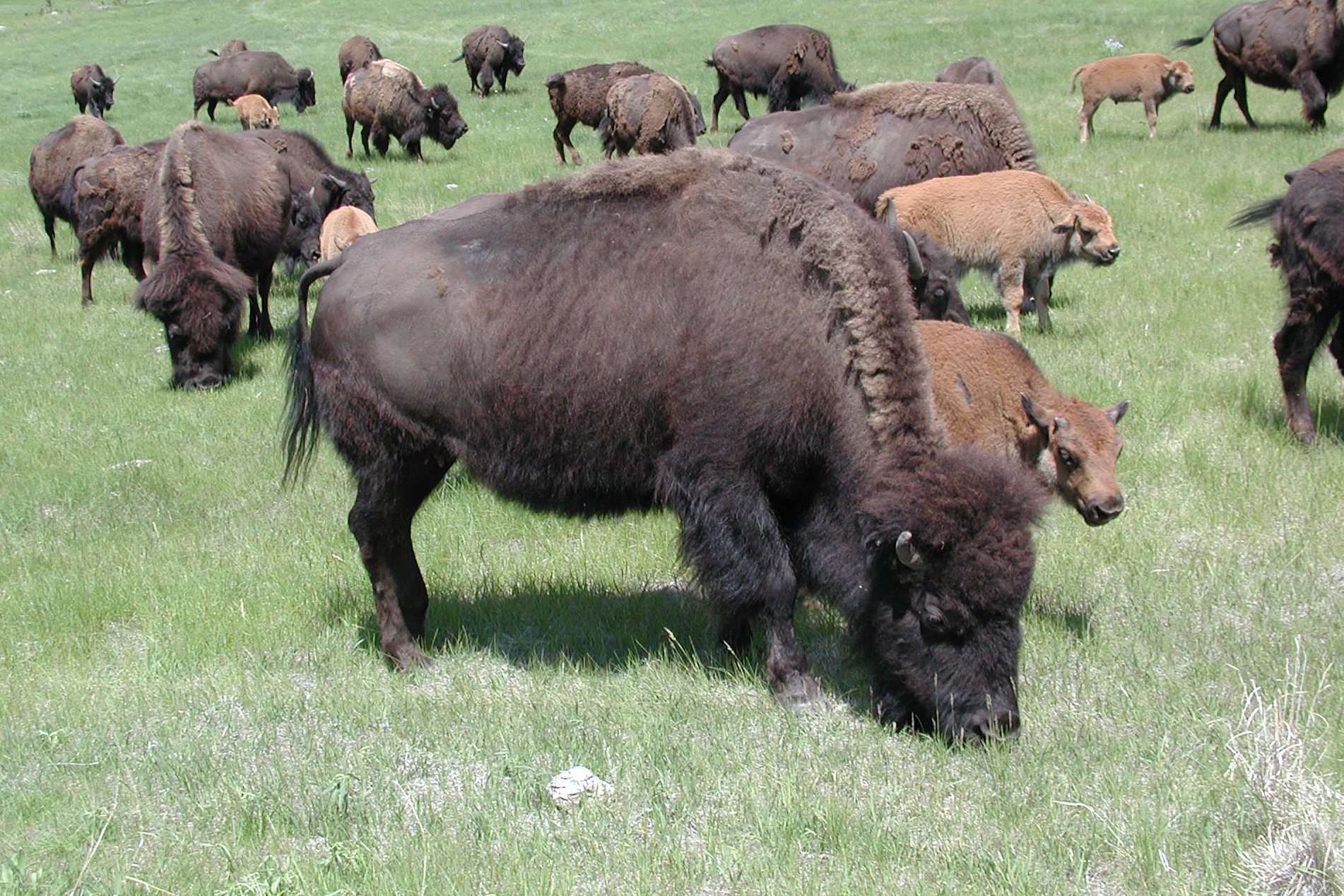
Bovids are herbivores, feeding on grass, foliage, and plant products. These plains bison are grazing

Most bovids alternately feed and ruminate throughout the day. While those that feed on concentrate feed and digest in short intervals, the roughage feeders take longer intervals. Only small species such as the duiker browse for a few hours during day or night. Feeding habits are related to body size; while small bovids forage in dense and closed habitat, larger species feed upon high-fiber vegetation in open grasslands. Subfamilies exhibit different feeding strategies. While Bovinae species graze extensively on fresh grass and diffused forage, Cephalophinae species (with the exception of Sylvicapra) primarily consume fruits. Reduncinae and Hippotraginae species depend on unstable food sources, but the latter are specially adapted to arid areas. Members of Caprinae, being flexible feeders, forage even in areas with low productivity. Tribes Alcelaphini, Hippotragini, and Reduncini have high proportions of monocots in their diets. On the contrary, Tragelaphini and Neotragini (with the exception of Ourebia) feed extensively on dicots. No conspicuous relationship exists between body size and consumption of monocots.

=== Sexuality and reproduction ===
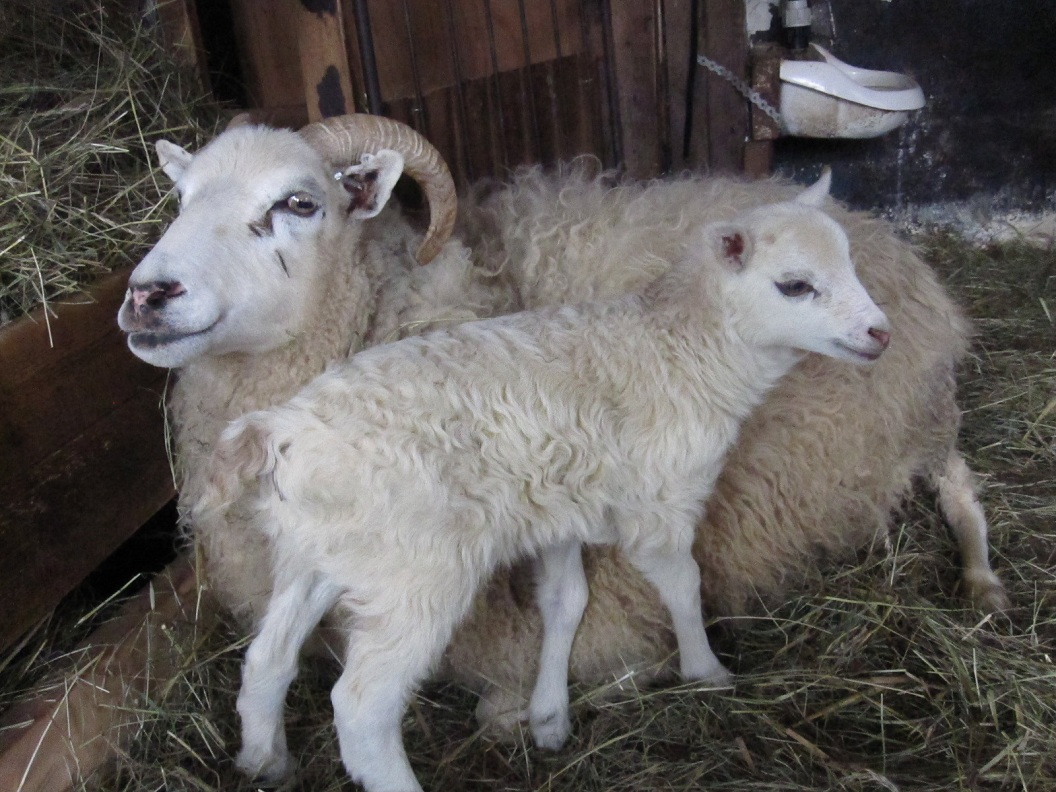
Juvenile sheep (lamb) near its mother

Most bovids are polygynous. In a few species, individuals are monogamous, resulting in minimal male-male aggression and reduced selection for large body size in males. Thus, sexual dimorphism is almost absent. Females may be slightly larger than males, possibly due to competition among females for the acquisition of territories. This is the case in duikers and other small bovids. The time taken for the attainment of sexual maturity by either sex varies broadly among bovids. Sexual maturity may even precede or follow mating. For instance, the impala males, though sexually mature by a year, can mate only after four years of age. On the contrary barbary sheep females may give birth to offspring even before they have gained sexual maturity. The delay in male sexual maturation is more visible in sexually dimorphic species, particularly the reduncines, probably due to competition among males. For instance, the blue wildebeest females become capable of reproduction within a year or two of birth, while the males become mature only when four years old.

All bovids mate at least once a year, and smaller species may even mate twice. Mating seasons occur typically during the rainy months for most bovids. As such, breeding might peak twice in the equatorial regions. The sheep and goats exhibit remarkable seasonality of reproduction, in the determination of which the annual cycle of daily photoperiod plays a pivotal role. Other factors that have a significant influence on this cycle include the temperature of the surroundings, nutritional status, social interactions, the date of parturition and the lactation period. A study of this phenomenon concluded that goats and sheep are short-day breeders. Mating in most sheep breeds begins in summer or early autumn. Mating in sheep is also affected by melatonin, that advances the onset of the breeding season; and thyroxine, that terminates the breeding season. Estrus lasts for at most a day in bovids, with the exception of bovines and tragelaphines. Except for the hartebeest and the topi, all bovids can detect estrus in females by testing the urine using the vomeronasal organ. Once the male is assured that the female is in estrus, he begins courtship displays; these displays vary greatly from the elaborate marches among gregarious species to the fervent licking of female genitalia among solitary species. Females, initially not receptive, ultimately mates with the male which has achieved dominance over others. Receptiveness is expressed by permission for mounting by the male and setting aside the tail by the female. Copulation generally takes a few seconds.

Gestational period varies among bovids – while duiker gestation ranges from 120 to 150 days, gestation in African buffalo ranges from 300 to 330 days. Usually, a single offspring is born (twins are less frequent), and it is able to stand and run by itself within an hour of birth. In monogamous species, males assist in defending their young, but that is not the case in polygynous species. Most newborn calves remain hidden for a week to two months, regularly nursed by their mothers. In some bovid species, the neonates start following about their mothers immediately or within a few days, as in the impala. Different bovids have different strategies for the defence of juveniles. For instance, while wildebeest mothers solely defend their young, buffaloes exhibit collective defence. Weaning might occur as early as two months (as in royal antelope) or as late as a year (as in muskox).

=== Lifespan ===
Most wild bovids live for 10 to 15 years. Larger species tend to live longer; for instance, American bison can live up to 25 years and gaur up to 30 years. The mean lifespan of domesticated individuals is nearly ten years. For example, domesticated goats have an average lifespan of 12 years. Usually males, mainly in polygynous species, have shorter lifespans than females. This can be attributed to several reasons: early dispersal of young males, aggressive male-male fights, vulnerability to predation (particularly when males are less agile, as in kudu), and malnutrition (being large in size, the male body has high nutritional requirements which may not be satisfied). Richard Despard Estes suggested that females mimic male secondary sexual characteristics like horns to protect their male offspring from dominant males. This feature seems to have been strongly selected to prevent male mortality and imbalanced sex ratios due to attacks by aggressive males and forced dispersal of young males during adolescence.

== Distribution ==
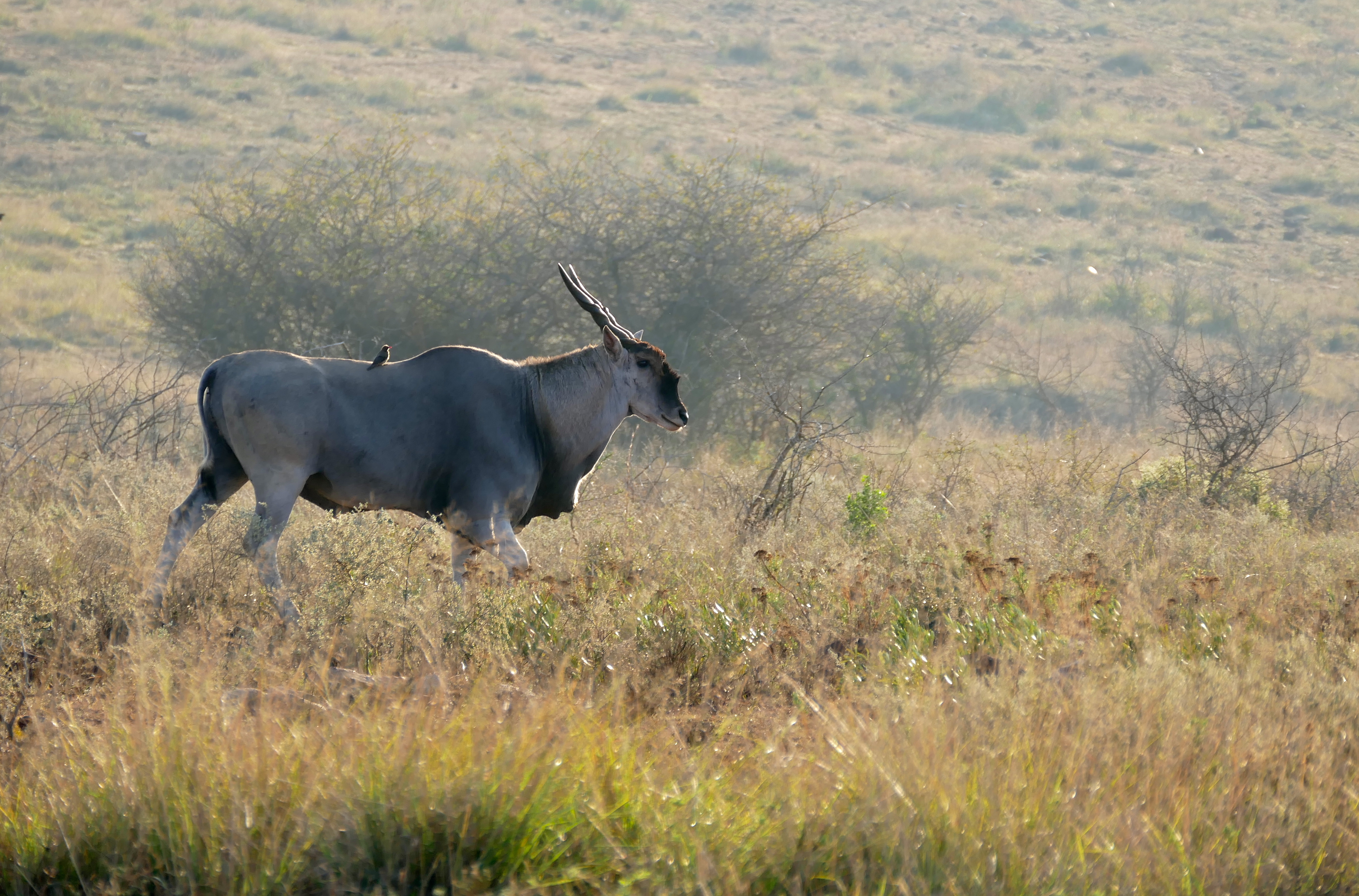
Eland occur in grasslands of Africa.

Most of the diverse bovid species occur in Africa. The maximum concentration is in the savannas of eastern Africa. Depending on their feeding habits, several species have radiated over large stretches of land, and hence several variations in dental and limb morphology are observed. Duikers inhabit the equatorial rainforests, sitatunga and lechwe occur near swamps, eland inhabit grasslands, springbok and oryx occur in deserts, bongo and anoa live in dense forests, and mountain goats and takin live at high altitudes. A few bovid species also occur in Europe, Asia, and North America. Sheep and goats are found primarily in Eurasia, though the Barbary sheep and the ibex form part of the African fauna. The muskox is confined to the arctic tundra. Several bovid species have been domesticated by human beings. The domestication of goats and sheep began 10 thousand years ago, while cattle were domesticated about 7.5 thousand years ago. These domesticated species are now found across the globe, being introduced to the Americas by European colonists.

== Interaction with humans ==
=== In human culture ===
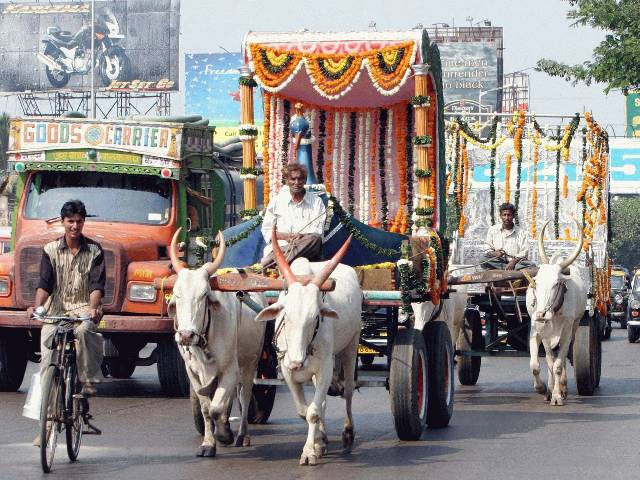
Zebu oxen in Mumbai

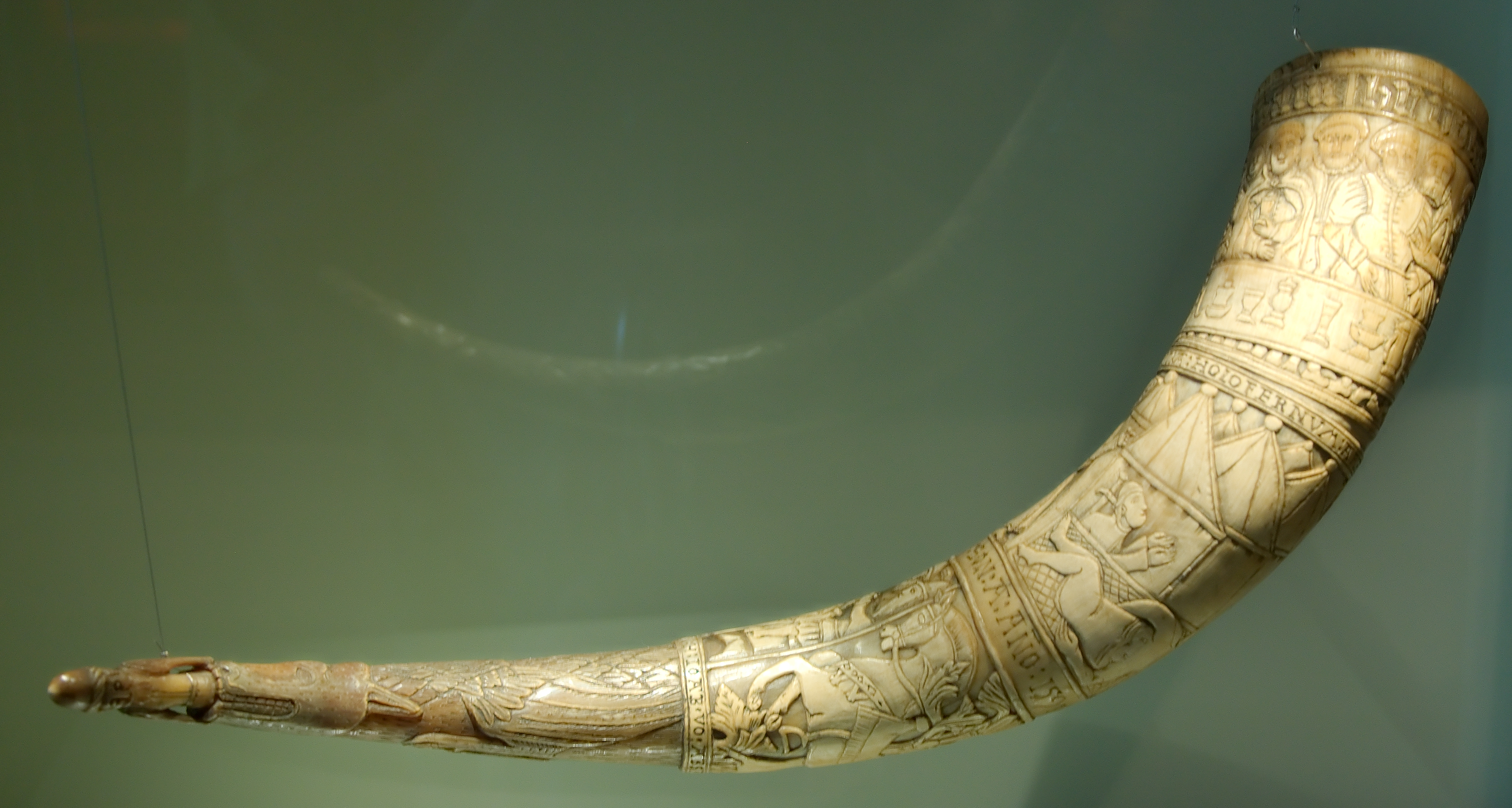
Drinking horn made by Brynjólfur Jónsson of Skarð, Iceland, 1598

Bovidae have featured in stories since at least the time of Aesop's fables from Ancient Greece around 600 BC. Fables by Aesop include The Crow and the Sheep, The Frog and the Ox, and The Wolf and the Lamb. The mythological creature Chimera, depicted as a lion, with the head of a goat arising from its back, and a tail that might end with a snake's head, was one of the offspring of Typhon and Echidna and a sibling of such monsters as Cerberus and the Lernaean Hydra. The sheep, synonymous with the goat in Chinese mythology, is the eighth animal of the Chinese zodiac, and a symbol of filial piety.

=== Domestication ===
The domestication of bovids has contributed to shifting the dependence of human beings from hunting and gathering to agriculture. The Bovidae includes three domesticated species whose use has spread around the world: cattle, sheep, and goats; all are from Eurasia. Other large bovids that have been domesticated but which have less ubiquitous distributions include the domestic buffalo (from the wild water buffalo), domestic yak (from the wild yak), zebu (from the Indian aurochs), gayal (from the gaur) and Bali cattle (from the banteng). Some antelopes have been domesticated including the oryxes, addax, elands and the extinct bubal hartebeest. In Ancient Egypt oryxes, addaxes and bubal hartebeests are depicted in carved walls.

The earliest evidence of cattle domestication is from 8000 BC, suggesting that the process began in Cyprus and the Euphrates basin.

==== Animal products ====
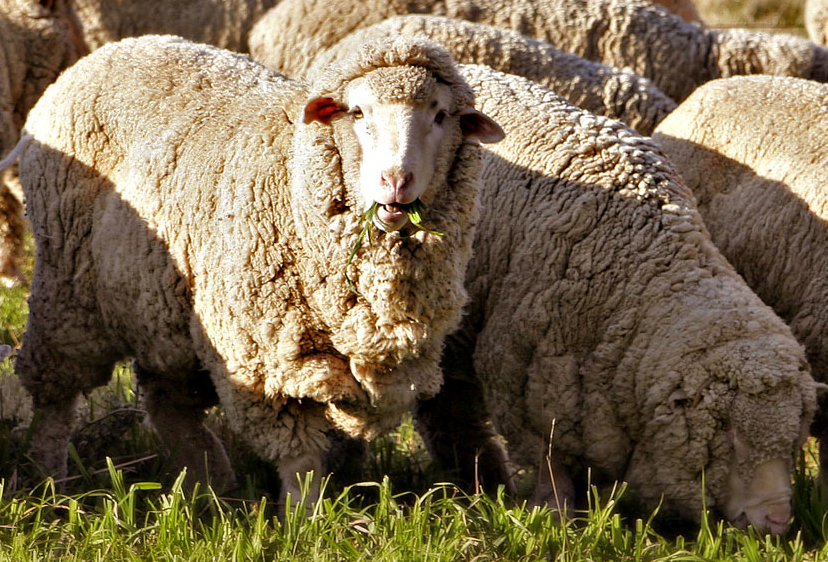
Merino wool is the most valued, with great fineness and softness.

Dairy products such as milk, butter, ghee, yoghurt, buttermilk and cheese are manufactured largely from domestic cattle, though the milk of sheep, goat, yak, and buffalo is also used in some parts of the world and for gourmet products. For example, buffalo milk is used to make mozzarella in Italy and gulab jamun dessert in India, while sheep milk is used to make blue Roquefort cheese in France. Beef is a food source high in zinc, selenium, phosphorus, iron, and B vitamins. Bison meat is lower in fat and cholesterol than beef, but has a higher protein content.

Bovid leather is tough and durable, with the additional advantage that it can be made into leathers of varying thicknesses – from soft clothing leather to hard shoe leather. While goat and cattle leather have a wide variety of use, sheepskin is suited only for clothing purposes. Wool from Merino hoggets is the finest and most valuable. Merino wool is 3–5 in (7.6–12.7 cm) long and very soft. Coarse wools, being durable and resistant to pilling, are used for making tough garments and carpets.

Bone meal is an important fertilizer rich in calcium, phosphorus, and nitrogen, effective in removing soil acidity. Bovid horns have been used as drinking vessels since antiquity.
