= Landon T. Clay =

American businessman

Landon T. Clay (born Landon Thomas Clay; March 12, 1926 – July 29, 2017) was an American businessman and founder of the Clay Mathematics Institute. He died on July 29, 2017, at his home in Peterborough, New Hampshire.

== Biography ==
Clay graduated from Harvard in 1950 with a B.A. in English. Clay was the chairman of Eaton Vance Corporation from 1971 to 1997 and a director of ADE Corporation since 1970 – a mutual fund management and distribution company. Clay served as chairman of the East Hill Management LLC, an investment advisory firm he founded in 1997. Clay was a director for the Dakota Mining corporation since 1990 and was a former director for the Golden Queen Mining Company Ltd. from 2006 to 2009. In addition from 1971 to 1997, Clay served on the board of Museum of Fine Arts. Clay also served as a director for Plasso Technology Limited.

Items from Clay's collection
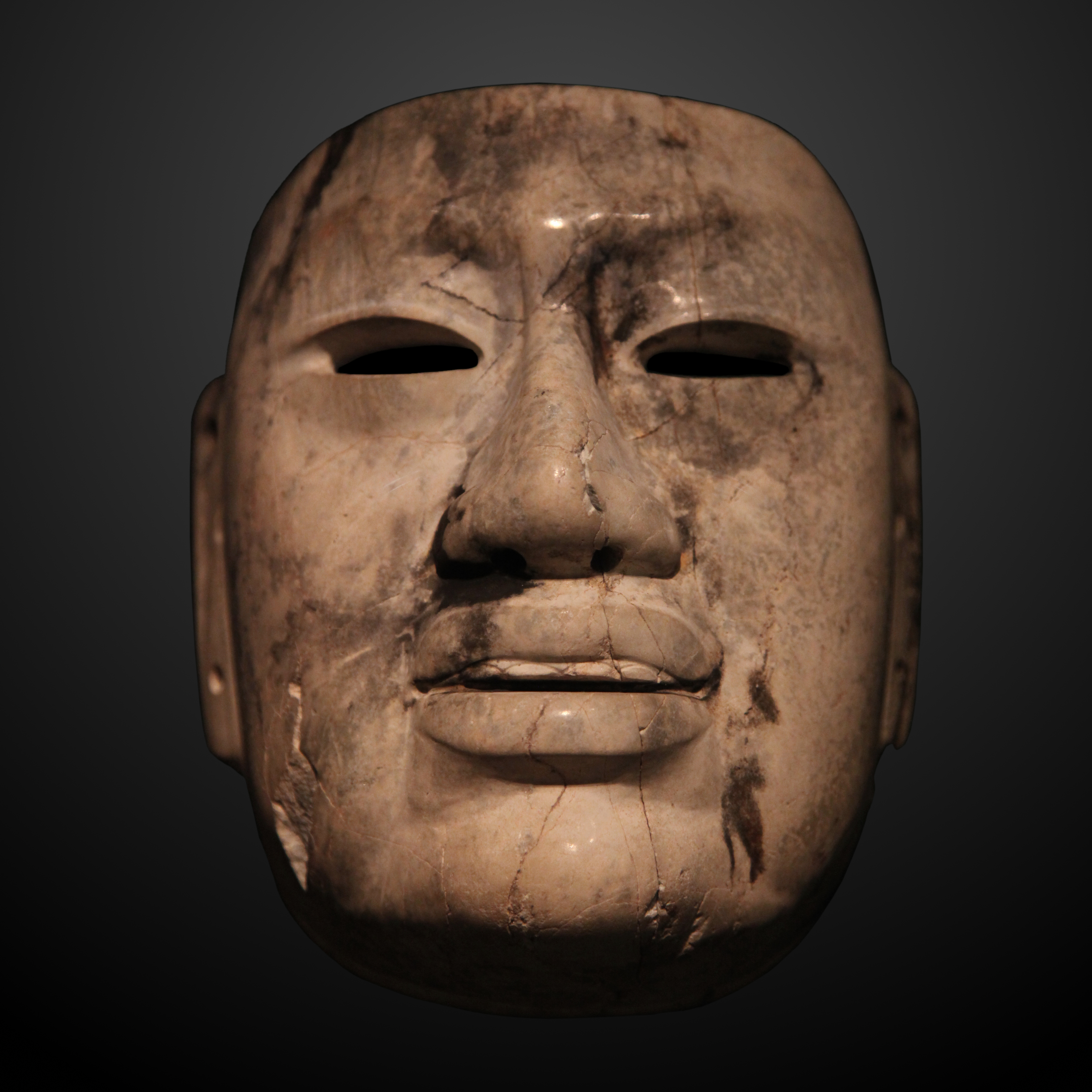
Jade Olmec mask

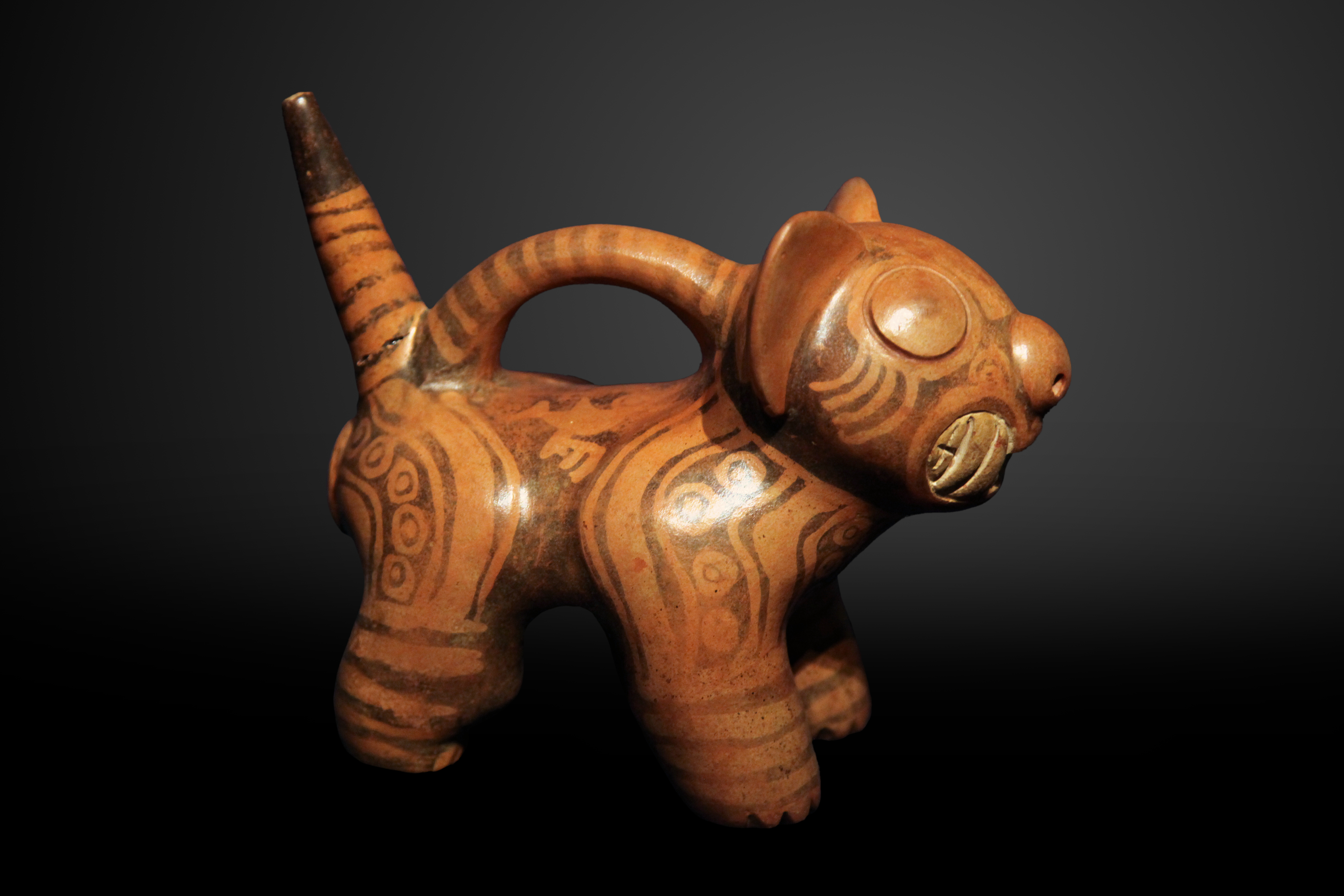
Earthenware Virú jaguar effigy vessel

Clay was also a supporter of astronomy, with one of his gifts through the Harvard College Observatory leading the Magellan Telescopes consortium to name one of the two 6.5-m components of the Magellan Telescope to be named for him, as well as a provider of Clay Postdoctoral Fellowships at the Smithsonian Astrophysical Observatory, part of the Center for Astrophysics | Harvard & Smithsonian. He also supported the Clay Center Observatory with its 24-inch telescope at the Dexter-Southfield School in Brookline, Massachusetts.
