= Peter Leishman =

American politician

Member of the New Hampshire House of Representatives from the Hillsborough 13th district
- In office 1996–2002

Member of the New Hampshire House of Representatives from the Hillsborough 6th district
- In office 2006–2008

Member of the New Hampshire House of Representatives from the Hillsborough 3rd district
- In office 2008–2010
- In office 2011–2012

Member of the New Hampshire House of Representatives from the Hillsborough 24th district
- In office 2012 – December 7, 2022

Member of the New Hampshire House of Representatives from the Hillsborough 33rd district
- Incumbent
- Assumed office December 7, 2022

Personal details
- Party: Democratic

Peter Leishman is an American politician. He serves as a Democratic member for the Hillsborough 33rd district of the New Hampshire House of Representatives.

In 2025, only two Democratic House members, Reps. Jonah Wheeler and Peter Leishman, both of Peterborough, voted against their party and in favor of House Bill 148 (a bill to eliminate transgender protections established by a 2018 anti-discrimination law). All other House and Senate members voted along party lines (Democrats against the bill, Republicans in favor of it).

== Electoral history ==
2022 Hillsborough 33rd New Hampshire House of Representatives Election, Democratic primary
Party	Candidate	Votes	%
Democratic	Jonah Wheeler	817	34.9
Democratic	Peter Leishman (incumbent)	777	33.2
Democratic	Ivy Vann (incumbent)	744	31.8
Total votes		2,338	100.0

2022 Hillsborough 33rd New Hampshire House of Representatives Election, General Election
Party	Candidate	Votes	%
Democratic	Jonah Wheeler	2,538	36.0
Democratic	Peter Leishman (incumbent)	2,433	34.5
Republican	Rachel Maidment	1,054	15.0
Republican	Matthew Pilcher	1,020	14.5
Total votes		7,045	100.0

2024 Hillsborough 33rd New Hampshire House of Representatives Election, Democratic primary
Party	Candidate	Votes	%
Democratic	Jonah Wheeler (incumbent)	1,009	37.8
Democratic	Peter Leishman (incumbent)	968	36.3
Democratic	Ivy Vann	690	25.9
Total votes		2,667	100.0

2024 Hillsborough 33rd New Hampshire House of Representatives Election, General Election
Party	Candidate	Votes	%
Democratic	Peter Leishman (incumbent)	2,932	39.6
Democratic	Jonah Wheeler (incumbent)	2,920	39.4
Republican	Kimberly Thomas	1,555	21.0
Total votes		7,407	100.0
