= Clay Mathematics Institute =

American foundation

Coordinates: 41°49′34.4″N 71°24′54.7″W

- Formation: 1998; 28 years ago
- Type: Non-profit
- Headquarters: Denver, Colorado, United States
- Location: Oxford, United Kingdom
- President: Martin R. Bridson
- Key people: Landon T. Clay; Lavinia D. Clay; Thomas Clay
- Website: www.claymath.org

The Clay Mathematics Institute (CMI) is a private, non-profit foundation dedicated to increasing and disseminating mathematical knowledge. It was established in 1998 through an endowment from American businessman Landon T. Clay. The institute supports mathematical research and education through funding, programs, and publications.

CMI is best known for its Millennium Prize Problems. It carries out activities, including conferences, workshops, summer schools, and a postdoctoral program supporting Clay Research Fellows.

== Governance ==
The institute is run according to a standard structure comprising a scientific advisory committee that decides on grant-awarding and research proposals, and a board of directors that oversees and approves the committee's decisions. As of May 2026, the board is made up of members of the Clay family, whereas the scientific advisory committee is composed of Simon Donaldson, Michael Hopkins, Andrei Okounkov, Gigliola Staffilani, Andrew Wiles, and Martin R. Bridson. Bridson is the current president of CMI.

== History ==
American businessman Landon T. Clay and his wife, Lavinia D. Clay, founded the Clay Mathematics Institute in September 1998. Landon Clay's interest in mathematics and its contribution to human knowledge motivated the institute's founding, which aimed to support mathematical research and promote wider appreciation of the subject.

The institute held its opening event at the Massachusetts Institute of Technology on 10 May 1999. Its first president was mathematician Arthur Jaffe.

== Millennium Prize Problems ==
The institute is best known for establishing the Millennium Prize Problems on May 24, 2000. These seven problems are considered by CMI to be "important classic questions that have resisted solution over the years." For each problem, the first person to solve it will be awarded US$1,000,000 by the CMI. In announcing the prize, CMI drew a parallel to Hilbert's problems, which were proposed in 1900, and had a substantial impact on 20th century mathematics. Of the initial 23 Hilbert problems, most of which have been solved, only the Riemann hypothesis (formulated in 1859) is included in the seven Millennium Prize Problems.

For each problem, the Institute had a professional mathematician write up an official statement of the problem, which will be the main standard against which a given solution will be measured. The seven problems are:

- P versus NP
- The Hodge conjecture
- The Poincaré conjecture – solved, by Grigori Perelman
- The Riemann hypothesis
- Yang–Mills existence and mass gap
- Navier–Stokes existence and smoothness – OpenAI published a solution in September 2026 however the result has yet to be verified by the Clay Institute or the independent mathematical community and is the subject of a priority dispute.
- The Birch and Swinnerton-Dyer conjecture

Some of the mathematicians who were involved in the selection and presentation of the seven problems were Michael Atiyah, Enrico Bombieri, Alain Connes, Pierre Deligne, Charles Fefferman, John Milnor, David Mumford, Andrew Wiles, and Edward Witten.

== Clay Research Award ==
The Clay Mathematics Institute presents the Clay Research Award in recognition of major breakthroughs in mathematical research. The awards are presented at the Clay Research Conference, which brings together mathematicians working across different areas of the discipline.

== Research and educational programs ==
=== Research fellowships ===
The institute supports early-career mathematicians through its Clay Research Fellowships. Fellows are selected for their research achievements and potential to make significant contributions to mathematics. The fellowships generally last between two and five years, providing financial support and allowing recipients to pursue research at institutions of their choice, subject to applicable employment and immigration requirements. Selection is overseen by the institute's Scientific Advisory Board.

=== Conferences and outreach ===
The institute organizes and funds mathematical conferences, workshops, summer schools, and educational programs. Its annual Clay Research Conference brings together mathematicians to present significant recent developments and serves as the occasion for presenting the Clay Research Awards. The institute also organizes smaller workshops and collaborates with other organizations through its Enhancement and Partnership Program.

The institute jointly organizes graduate summer schools with the Heilbronn Institute for Mathematical Research. Its educational outreach includes partnerships with the Program in Mathematics for Young Scientists (PROMYS) and PROMYS Europe, which provide mathematical enrichment opportunities for students.

=== Publications and digitization ===
The institute supports the dissemination of mathematical research through books, lecture notes, and digital resources. It has also undertaken projects to preserve and make historical mathematical documents accessible. In 2005, working with the Bodleian Library and Octavo.com, it produced a digital version of a surviving ninth-century manuscript of Euclid's Elements. Other digitization projects have included Bernhard Riemann's 1859 paper on the distribution of prime numbers, the seminar records of Felix Klein, and correspondence between Ada Lovelace and Augustus De Morgan.
