= Richard Despard Estes =

American biologist (1927–2021)

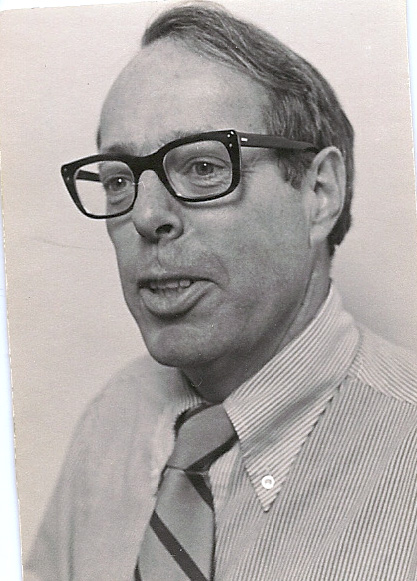

Richard Despard Estes (December 26, 1927 - December 6, 2021) was an American ethologist and biologist specialising in the behaviour of mammals in mainland Africa. He was particularly interested in studying wildebeest. This interest led Rod East, the former co-chair of the Antelope Specialist Group of the IUCN-World Conservation Union, to dub him the 'Guru of Gnu.' It has been suggested that Estes is responsible for most of the world's knowledge of wildebeest behaviour.

Estes chose to study wildebeest because he thought they were 'the most interesting' animals he knew, particularly in their rutting behaviour. He obtained his doctorate in the early 1960s with a thesis on the wildebeest of the Ngorongoro Crater, in which he advanced the theory that the females' estrus was triggered by the rumbling 'love call' of the males. Estes has spent most of the ensuing 40 years doing field work in Africa. In 2004 he began a project in cooperation with the Smithsonian Institution to test his early theory using new advances in molecular chemistry.

Estes has written two guides for travellers to Africa, The Behavior Guide to African Mammals (considered the standard reference of its kind) and The Safari Companion.

Estes lived in Peterborough, New Hampshire until his death in 2021.

== Bibliography ==
- The Behavior Guide to African Mammals: Including Hoofed Mammals, Carnivores, Primates, University of California Press, 1991
- National Audubon Society Field Guide to African Wildlife (with Peter C. Alden, Duane Schlitter and Bunny McBride), Knopf, 1995
- The Safari Companion: A Guide to Watching African Mammals Including Hoofed Mammals, Carnivores, and Primates, Chelsea Green Publishing Company, 1999
