= Ivy Vann =

American politician

Member of the New Hampshire House of Representatives from the Hillsborough 24th district
- In office 2014–2022

Personal details
- Party: Democratic
- Education: Harvard College (BA); Antioch College (MEd)

Ivy Vann is a Democratic member politician who served in the New Hampshire House of Representatives from 2014 to 2022, where she represented the Hillsborough 24 district.
