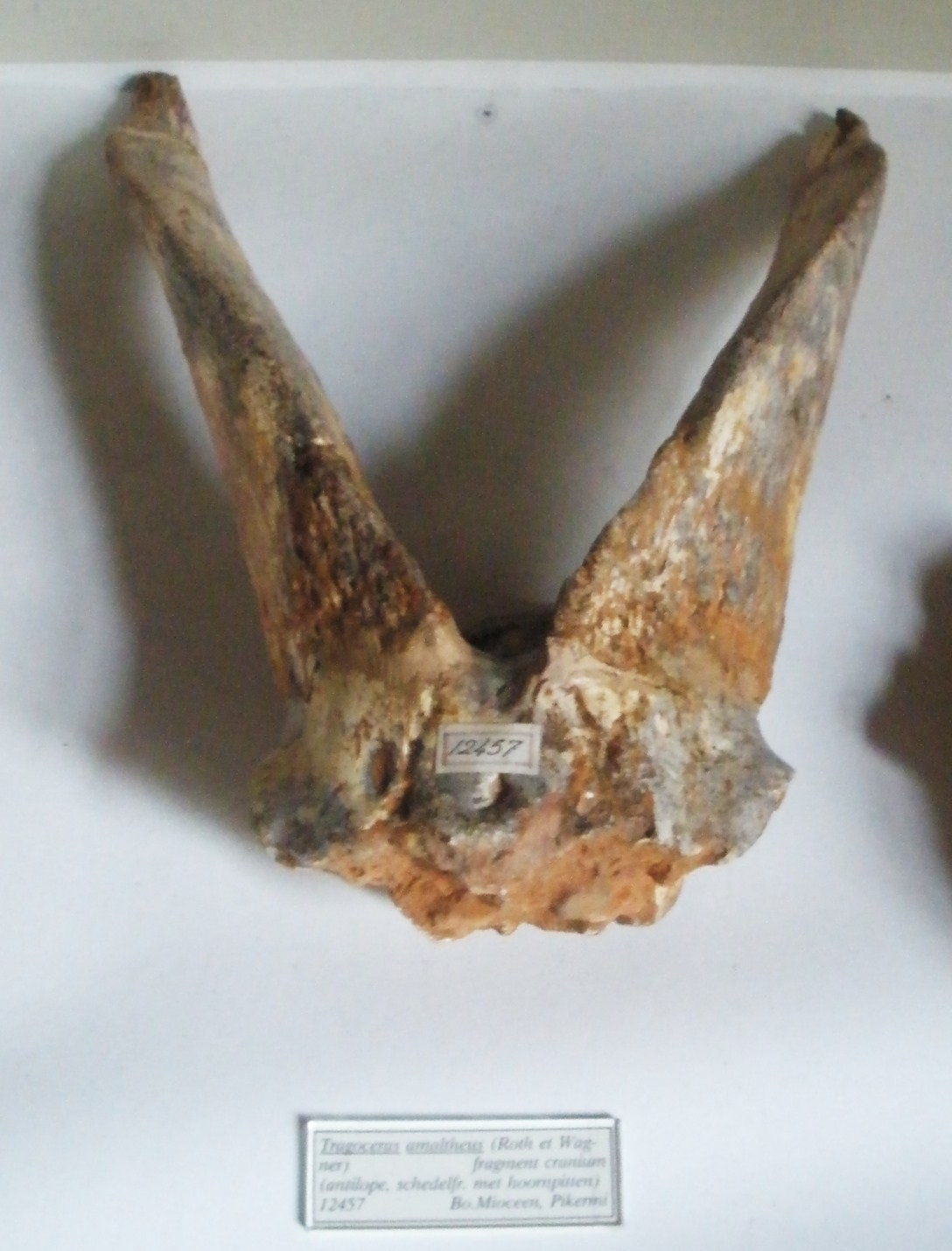
- Horns of Tragoportax amalthea

Scientific classification
- Kingdom: Animalia
- Phylum: Chordata
- Class: Mammalia
- Order: Artiodactyla
- Family: Bovidae
- Subfamily: Bovinae
- Tribe: †Tragoportacini
- Genus: †Tragoportax; Pilgrim, 1937

Type species
- Tragoportax salmontanus Pilgrim, 1937

Other species
- See text

Synonyms
- Synonyms: Capra amalthea Roth & Wagner, 1854; Tragocerus Gaudry, 1861; Pontoportax Kretzoi, 1941; Gazelloportax Kretzoi, 1941; ?Mirabilocerus Hadjiev, 1961; Tragoceridus Kretzoi, 1968; Mesembriportax Gentry, 1974; Mesotragocerus Korotkevich, 1982

= Tragoportax =

Tragoportax Temporal range: Turolian–Ruscinian 9.0–5.3 Ma

Extinct genus of bovid

Tragoportax is an extinct genus of bovid ungulate. It lived from the upper Miocene to the earliest Pliocene, and its fossils have been found in southeastern Europe, parts of Africa, and the Indian Subcontinent. Tragoportax was formerly considered a close relative of the extant nilgai, though more recent studies suggest that it, and several other Miocene "boselaphins", formed a tribe of their own. The number of Tragoportax species has varied over the years, and some have been reassigned to the related genus Miotragocerus. The first Tragoportax specimens were discovered in Greece, and were originally assigned to Capra. Subsequently, they were reassigned to Tragocerus. This genus name was preoccupied by a beetle, and thus Tragoportax is the correct name.

Like many modern antelopes, Tragoportax exhibited sexual dimorphism. Both sexes were horned, with those of males being longer and slenderer, often curving backwards. The postcrania of the genus resemble those of large deer, such as red deer, and it may have been similar ecologically. Some species, like T. amalthea, inhabited lightly wooded environments, and fed predominantly on leaves. Others, like T. rugosifrons, were probably mixed feeders, feeding on both leaves and grasses. Tragoportax might have been cursorial.

== Taxonomy ==
=== Early history ===
The first of the specimens currently assigned to Tragoportax, three horn cores with parts of their skulls still attached, were discovered in Pikermi, Greece. In 1854, Johannes Roth and Johann Andreas Wagner assigned the fossils to the goat genus, Capra. The new taxon was named Capra amalthea, after Amalthea, a nymph that nursed the infant Zeus on goat milk in Greek mythology. A few years later, in 1861 Jean Albert Gaudry recognised that the Pikermi fossils were distinct enough from Capra to warrant a genus of their own. He assigned them to the genus Tragocerus; however, Tragocerus was preoccupied by a longhorn beetle. In 1937, Guy Ellcock Pilgrim coined the generic name Tragoportax, to include fossils recovered from the Sivalik Hills in Pakistan. For the time being, the two genera were kept separate, though Pilgrim noted strong similarities between Tragocerus and the new genus. In 1971, Alan William Gentry rendered Tragocerus invalid, and assigned some of its species to Miotragocerus. By 2009, Tragocerus amalthea had been reassigned to Tragoportax, though Tragocerus was apparently regarded as valid by some authorities well into the 1980s.

In 1904, Max Schlosser named a second species of Tragoportax (then Tragocerus), T. rugosifrons, based on material recovered from Samos, Greece. Specimens from Bulgaria, Moldova, Pakistan and Ukraine have been subsequently assigned to T. rugosifrons, as well as a possible specimen from Iran.

Tragoportax curvicornis, also originally found in Samos, was originally assigned to the genus Mirabilocerus, though that genus may be a synonym of Tragocerus. In 1941, Miklós Kretzoi described Gazelloportax and Pontoportax to accommodate fossils now assigned to Tragoportax. In 1974, Gentry named Mesembriportax acrae based on remains from the Early Pliocene of South Africa. It has since been determined that Mesembriportax exhibits all of the cranial characteristics of Tragoportax, and as such, it was reassigned to that genus in 2004. In 1968, Krezoi attempted to revive Tragocerus as a subgenus, Tragoceridus; this was subsequently synonymised.

=== Classification ===
Tragoportax has often been assigned to the tribe Boselaphini or subfamily Boselaphinae, alongside the modern nilgai (Boselaphus tragocamelus). However, Bibi et al. (2009) suggested that Boselaphinae as defined was probably non-monophyletic, and that Tragoportax and its relatives should form a separate tribe, Tragoportacini. This tribe would additionally include Austroportax, Kipsigicerus, Miotragocerus, Protragocerus, and Strepsiportax.

=== Inner systematics ===
Tragoportax fossils have been recovered from southeastern Europe, Libya, South Africa, and the Indian subcontinent. Most specimens are from the Turolian European Land Mammal Age (equivalent to the Tortonian and Messinian stages) of the Miocene, though there are some specimens that may date to the earliest Pliocene (the Ruscinian, corresponding to the Zanclean and early Piacenzian). The question of how many species are actually valid is a matter of debate: T. rugosifrons alone has five junior synonyms. Denis Geraads and Nikolai Spassov, in 2004, recognised only eight, or nine if T. maius is not a synonym of T. eldaricus. A list of Tragoportax species, per that study, is as follows:

Taxon	Country of origin	Author(s) of taxon	Taxon publication year
T. acrae	South Africa	Gentry	1974
T. amalthea	Greece	Roth & Wagner	1854
T. curvicornis	Pakistan	Andree	1926
T. cyrenaicus	Libya	Thomas	1979
T. eldaricus	Azerbaijan	Gabashvili	1956
T. macedoniensis	Greece	Bouvrain	1988
?T. maius	Georgia	Meladze	1967
T. rugosifrons	Bulgaria, Greece, ?Iran, Moldova, Pakistan, & Ukraine	Schlosser	1904
T. salmonatus	Pakistan	Pilgrim	1937

Multiple taxonomic revisions have taken place in the intervening years. T. macedoniensis is treated in some papers as a species of Miotragocerus. In 2009, a new Tragoportax species, T. abyssinicus, was described from the Late Miocene of Afar, Ethiopia. In 2023, another new species, T. perses, was described from Iran.

== Description ==
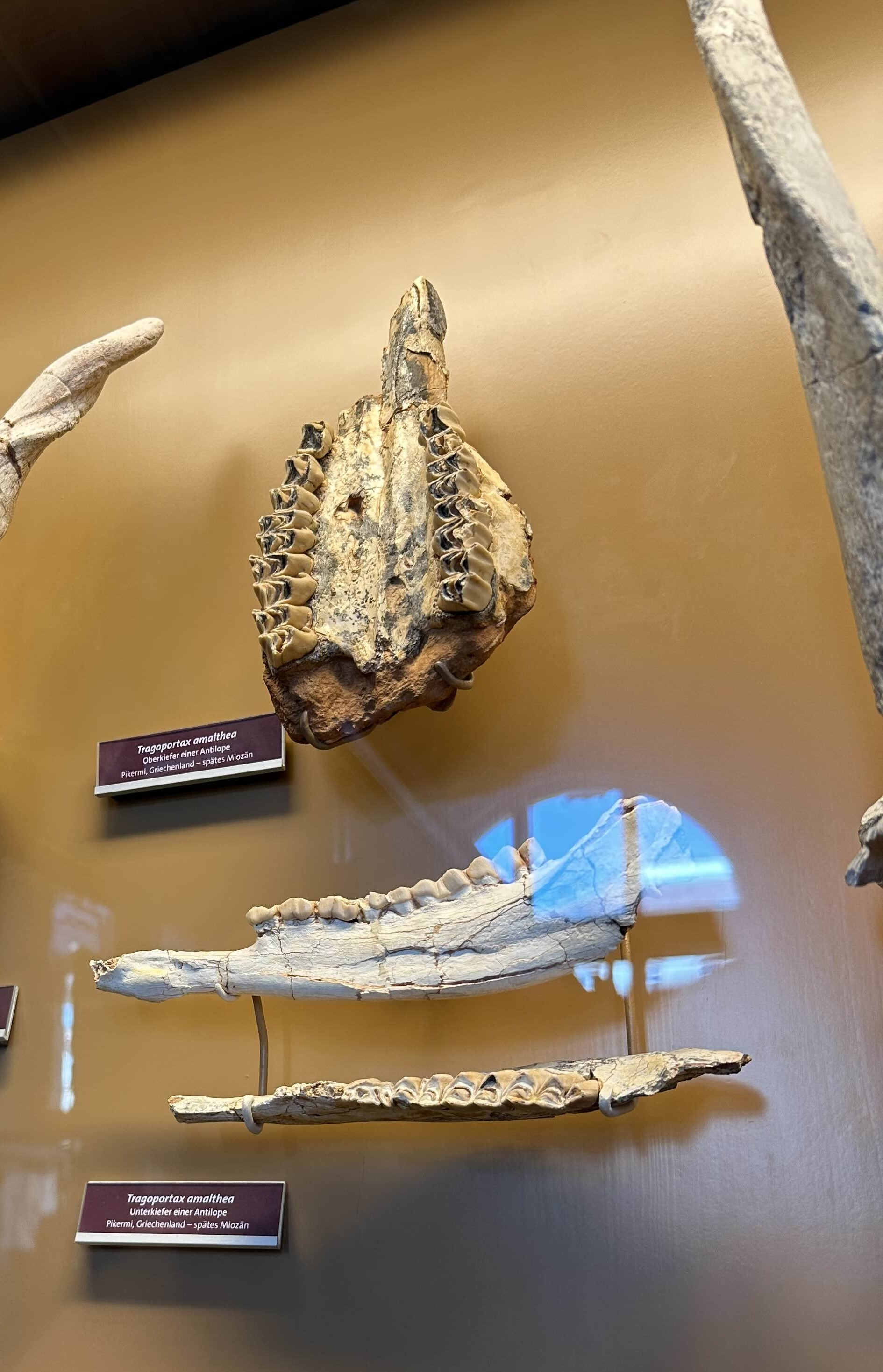
Upper jaw and mandibles of Tragoportax amalthea from Pikermi

Tragoportax species varied in size. Most species were approximately the size of a red deer. In 1993, Meike Köhler estimated the body mass of T. amalthea at around 80 kg (180 lb).

=== Skull and dentition ===
The snout of Tragoportax was short, though the basicranium was fairly long. As with many modern antelope species, the horns are fairly diagnostic, and can be used to differentiate species. In some species, like T. amalthea, the horns were twisted, whereas in others they were relatively straight. The horns of adult males were longer and slenderer than those of females and younger individuals, and often curved backwards. They were triangular or sub-triangular in cross-section, and were less laterally compressed than those of the related Miotragocerus. Some specimens of T. curvicornis are completely hornless. Tragoportax's teeth were brachydont (low-crowned) to mesodont (having mid-sized crowns). The premolars are fairly long and are not molarised, though show the first signs of it. They are shorter than those of Miotragocerus. The second premolar is shorter than the third, particularly the anterior (front) portion, with a parastyle that curved backwards.

=== Postcrania ===
The postcranial elements of Tragoportax were similar in many respects to cervids. The limbs overall were fairly long, and it may have been at least somewhat cursorial. The metapodials were large, slender and transversally compressed, overall resembling those of cervids. They were robust compared to those of Miotragocerus.

== Palaeoecology ==
Tragoportax amalthea likely inhabited lightly wooded environments. On the other hand, T. macedoniensis (if it is Tragoportax), however, likely inhabited more forested environments, as it possesses traits characteristic of forest-dwelling bovids, such as reductions in body and horn size. Based on morphological similarities with cervids like the red deer, at least some species probably were folivorous (had a leaf-heavy diet), while others were graminivorous (had a grass-heavy diet). An analysis of enamel stable isotopes and dental microwear of various species of bovids from the Late Miocene of Bulgaria suggests that T. rugosifrons was a mixed feeder, eating both leaves and grasses, while another microwear study of T. rugosifrons from Samos suggests it was predominantly a grazer. At Ravin des Zouaves-5, the δ^{13}C values of T. rugosifrons are higher than most of the other bovids. The microwear of T. amalthea from the fossil site of Nikiti 2 in the Chalkidiki Peninsula suggests its dietary ecospace lay somewhere on or near the boundary between mixed feeders and variable grazers, while at Samos and Pikermi, it was concluded based on its microwear to have been a grazer and a mixed feeder, respectively. The evolution of browsing habits in Tragoportax may have been driven by increased competition from other grazing mammal clades, such as rhinocerotids and equids.
