= Vallesian =

Geologic period

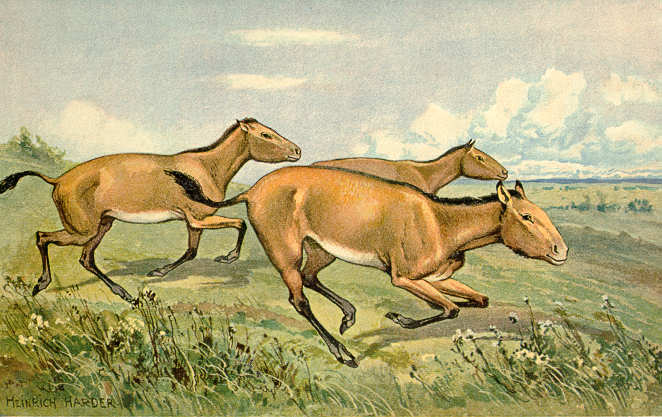
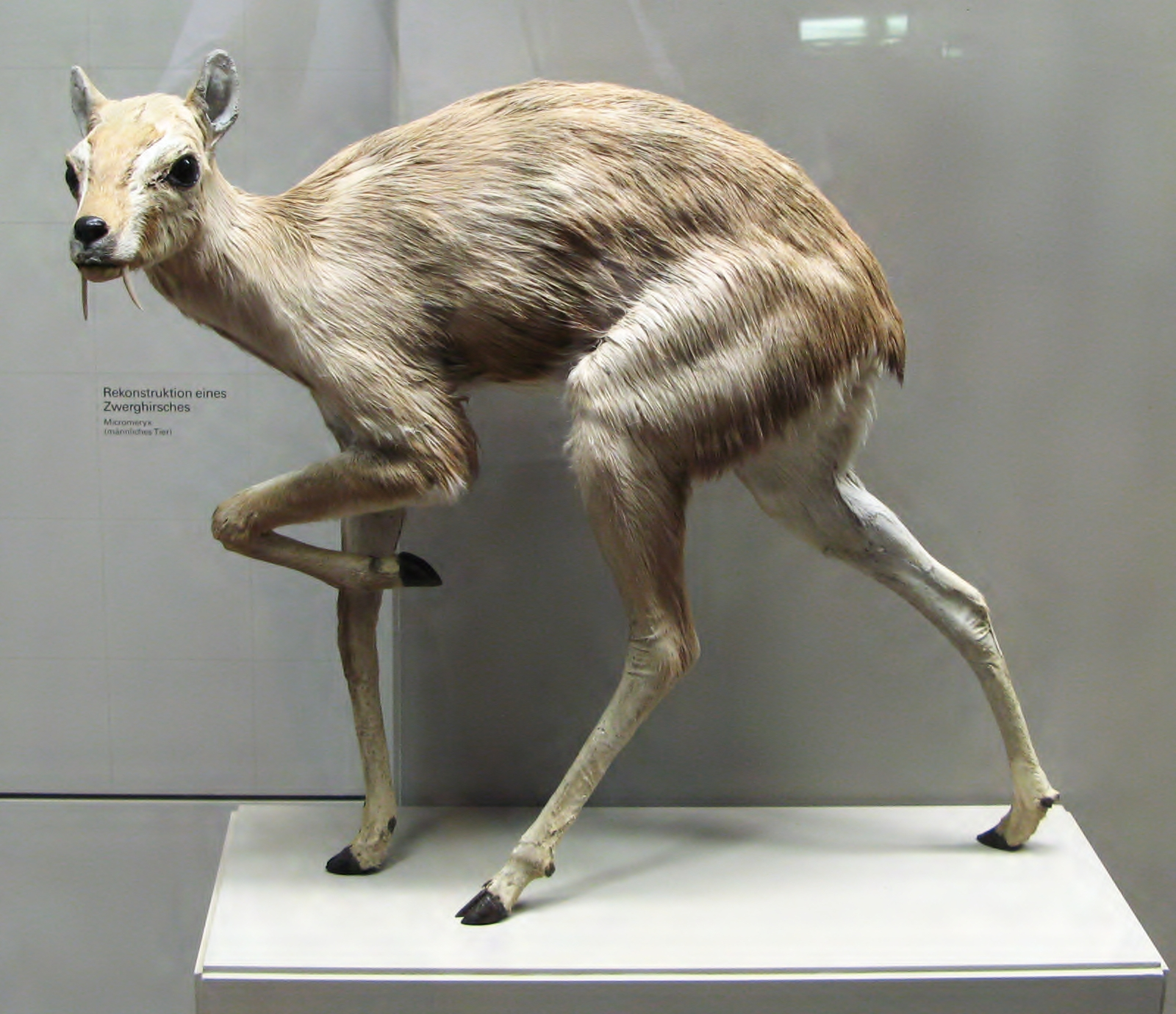
The arrival of Hipparion (left) marked the demise of older taxa such as Micromeryx (right)

The Vallesian age is a period of geologic time (11.6–9.0 Ma) within the Miocene used more specifically with European Land Mammal Ages. It precedes the Turolian age and follows the Astaracian age. The so-called Vallesian Crisis resulted in the extinction of several mammalian taxa characteristic of the Middle Miocene.

The term "Vallesian" was introduced by Catalan palaeontologist Miquel Crusafont in 1950 to mark the arrival of the equid Hipparion in Europe. The remaining European palaeofaunas, however, had been around since the Middle Miocene, including the moschid Micromeryx (a musk deer), the cervid Euprox, the suid Listriodon, and the felids Sansanosmilus and Pseudaelurus, and the Aragonian-Vallesian (Note: "Aragonian" is a Spanish term for a continental stage, roughly equivalent to the Middle Miocene or Astaracian (16–11 Ma).) boundary does not represent a major shift in the European mammalian record. In contrast, the transition between Lower and Upper Vallesian corresponds to a major biotic crisis — the demise of most Aragonian artiodactyls, including the antelope Protragocerus, the bovid Miotragocerus, Listriodon, and the suids Hyotherium and Parachleusastochoerus. The crisis also affected rodents such as the family Eomyidae and most of the cricetids and glirids. They were replaced by species arriving from the east, Turolian in character: for example the suid Schizochoerus, the murid Progonomys, the bovids Tragoportax and Graecoryx, the hyaenid Adcrocuta, the felid Paramachairodus, and the suid Microstonyx.

The Vallesian was a crucial period for the evolution of the European terrestrial fauna. During the Middle Miocene, the highly diversified mammalian fauna of the European forests were replaced by the faunas of the Late Miocene, adapted to a dry climate and to an open terrain. The beginning of the period is marked by the appearance and dispersal of the early horse Hipparion throughout Eurasia. The so-called Vallesian Crisis resulted in the extinction of several mammalian taxa characteristic of the Middle Miocene, linked to an increase in seasonality around 9 Ma. The end of the Vallesian, and the beginning of the Turolian, brought the extinction in the west of faunas dominated by the bovids and giraffids characteristic of the so-called sub-Paratethyan or Greek-Iranian province.
