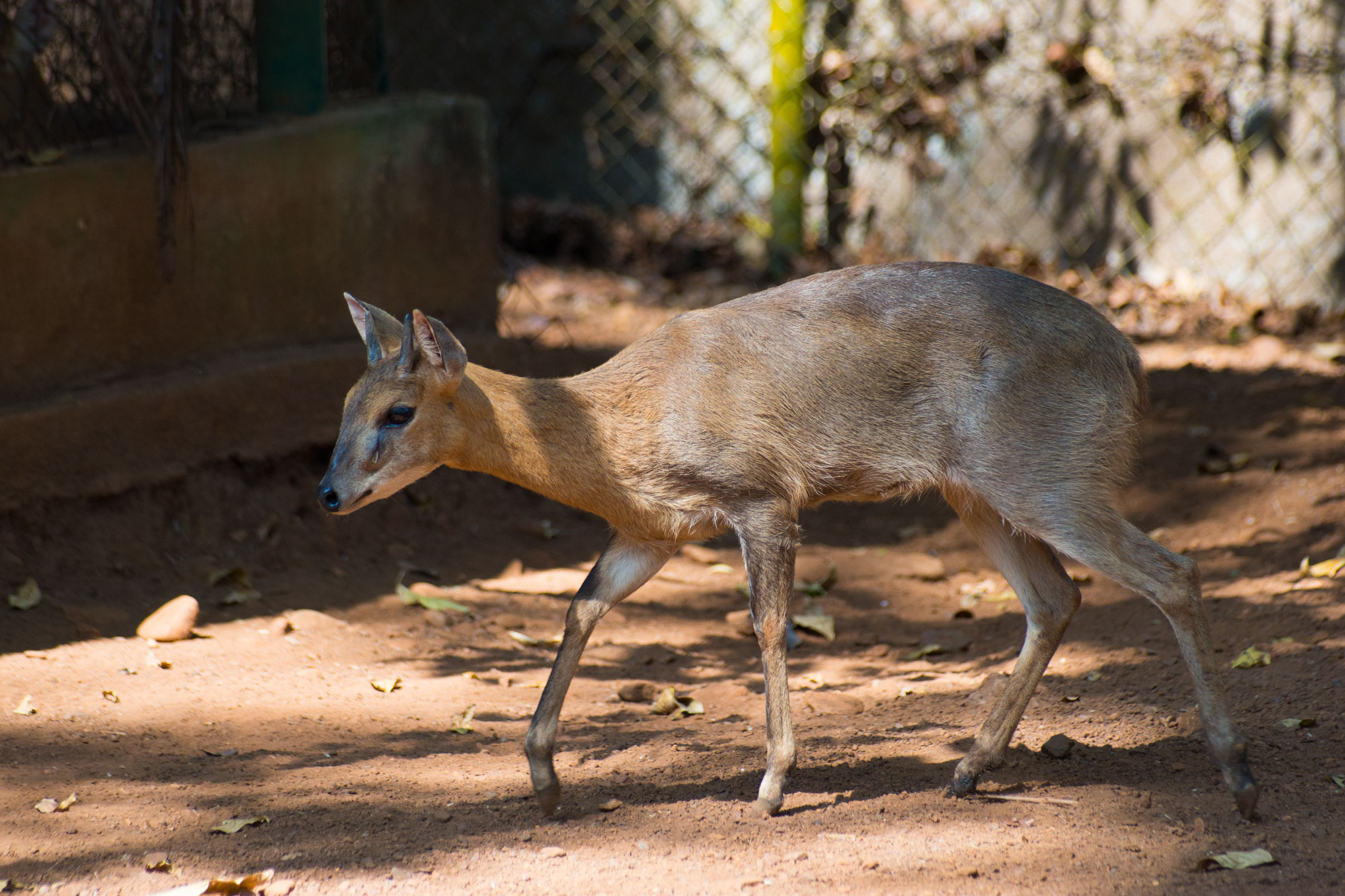
- Bondla Wildlife Sanctuary, India

Conservation status
- Vulnerable (IUCN 3.1)
- CITES Appendix III

Scientific classification
- Kingdom: Animalia
- Phylum: Chordata
- Class: Mammalia
- Order: Artiodactyla
- Family: Bovidae
- Subfamily: Bovinae
- Tribe: Boselaphini
- Genus: Tetracerus; Leach, 1825
- Species: T. quadricornis

Binomial name
- Tetracerus quadricornis (Blainville, 1816)

Subspecies
- T. q. iodes (Hodgson, 1847); T. q. quadricornis (Blainville, 1816); T. q. subquadricornutus (Elliot, 1839)
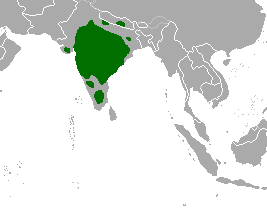
- Range map of the four-horned antelope

Synonyms
- List: Antilope chickara (J. B. Fischer, 1829); A. quadricornis (Desmarest, 1816); Cerophorus quadricornis (J. B. Fischer, 1829); Cervicapra chickara (Hardwicke, 1825); C. quadricornis (de Blainville, 1816); Cervus labipes (Saint-Hillaire and Cuvier, 1832); Grimmia quadricornis (Laurillard, 1839); Tetraceros chickera (Blyth, 1842); Tetracerus chickara (Jardine, 1836); T. paccerois (Houghton, 1847); T. quadricornes (Jardine, 1836); T. striaticornis (Saint-Hillaire and Cuvier, 1832); T. undicornis (Saint-Hillaire and Cuvier, 1832)

= Four-horned antelope =

Small species of antelope from Asia

The four-horned antelope (Tetracerus quadricornis), also called chousingha, is a small bovid antelope native to central, South and Western India, along with a smaller population in Nepal. The sole member of the genus Tetracerus, the chousingha was first scientifically described in 1816 by French zoologist Henri Marie Ducrotay de Blainville. Three regional subspecies are currently recognised. The four-horned antelope has a yellowish-tan, sometimes reddish or goldenrod coat. It is slender with thin legs and a short tail. It stands nearly 55–64 cm (22–25 in) at the shoulder and weighs about 17–22 kg (37–49 lb). Its four horns are unique among antelopes and distinguish it from most other bovids. The longer pair of straight, spike-like horns is atop its head between the ears, while the other, shorter pair is on the forehead; its posterior horns are always longer than the anterior horns, which may even present as merely fur-covered "studs". While the posterior horns measure 8–12 cm (3.1–4.7 in), the anterior ones are usually 2–5 cm (0.79–1.97 in) long.

The four-horned antelope is diurnal (active mainly during the day) and typically solitary by nature, though some antelope may form loose groups of three to five animals, usually one or more adults, possibly accompanied by calves. This elusive antelope feeds on grasses, herbs, shrubs, foliage, flowers and fruits. It needs to drink water frequently; as such it stays in places near water sources. The breeding behaviour of the four-horned antelope has not been well studied. The age at which they reach sexual maturity and the season when mating occurs have not been understood well. Gestation lasts about eight months, following which one or two calves are born. They are kept concealed for the first few weeks of their birth. The young remain with the mother for about a year.

Four-horned antelopes tend to inhabit areas with significant grass cover or heavy undergrowth, and avoid human settlements or the presence of dogs. Once more common throughout deciduous forests in India, the four-horned antelope now occurs in disjunct, fragmented populations, with genetic "bottlenecking" (e.g. inbreeding) becoming a potential threat to the stability of future populations that do not intermingle during mating seasons. The four-horned antelope is threatened by the loss of its natural habitat due to agricultural expansion. Because of its four-horned skull and its horns it was historically a target for trophy hunters. It is presently listed as vulnerable on the IUCN Red List.

== Etymology ==
The scientific name of the four-horned antelope is Tetracerus quadricornis. The generic name Tetracerus is the combination of two Greek words: tetra meaning "four" and keras meaning "horn". The specific name quadricornis is derived from two Latin words: quattuor meaning "four" and cornu "horn". The four-horned antelope is known by several vernacular names: chausingha, chowsingha, chousingha (Hindi for "four horns"), doda, ghutri (mainly in central India) (Hindi); kondu kuri (Kannada); chauka (Nepalese); nari komboo marn (Tamil).

== Taxonomy and phylogeny ==
The four-horned antelope is the sole member of the genus Tetracerus, and is placed under the family Bovidae. The species was first described by French zoologist Henri Marie Ducrotay de Blainville in 1816. The four-horned antelope has only one other relative in the tribe Boselaphini, the nilgai (Boselaphus tragocamelus). The Boselaphini have horns with a keel on the front and lack rings as found in other antelope groups.

The authority for Tetracerus is variously indicated according to interpretations of the International Code of Zoological Nomenclature. The name was first published in an 1825 publication by English naturalist Thomas Hardwicke but cited the English zoologist William Elford Leach – probably by an editor – as the authority in a footnote at the end of the publication. Philip Sclater and Oldfield Thomas listed Hardwicke as the genus authority by virtue of his being the author of the publication. However, Leach is now identified as the appropriate authority based on Article 50.1.1 of the Zoological Code.

A 1992 phylogenetic study showed a strong possibility of a clade consisting of Boselaphini, Bovini and Tragelaphini. Bovini consists of the genera Bubalus, Bos, Pseudoryx (saola), Syncerus (African buffalo), Bison and the extinct Pelorovis. Tragelaphini consists of two genera: Taurotragus (eland) and Tragelaphus. Boselaphini and Tragelaphini were predicted to be close; this was seconded by a similar study in 1999. The following cladogram is based on the 1992 study:

- - Bovini
  - - Tragelaphini
    - Boselaphini

Colin Groves (2003) recognizes three subspecies of the four-horned antelope on the basis of distribution and physical characteristics such as coat colour, body size and the number of horns:

- T. q. iodes (Hodgson, 1847): distributed north of the Ganges in Nepal
- T. q. quadricornis (de Blainville, 1816): distributed in peninsular India
- T. q. subquadricornutus (Elliot, 1839) distributed in the Western Ghats and southern India

== Evolution ==
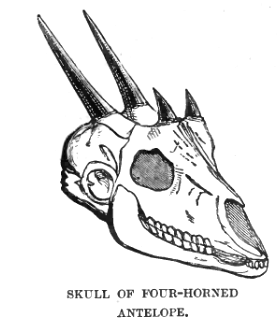
Skull of the four-horned antelope

Though Boselaphini has no African representation today, fossil evidence supports its presence in the continent as early as the late Miocene – the two living antelopes of this tribe, in fact, have been found to have a closer relationship with the earliest bovids (like Eotragus species) than do the other bovids. This tribe originated at least 8.9 Mya, in much the same area where the four-horned antelope occurs today, and may represent the most "primitive" of all living bovids, having changed the least since the origins of the family. The extant and extinct boselaphine forms show similar development of the horn cores (the central bony part of the horn). It is thought that ancestral bovids had a diploid chromosome number of 58 which has reduced in Tetracerus to 38 through a process of concatenation of some chromosomes.

Fossils of Protragocerus labidotus and Sivoreas eremita dating back to the late Miocene have been discovered in the Ngorora formation (Kenya). Fossils from the same period have also been excavated in the eastern Mediterranean region. Other Miocene fossils of boselaphines discovered are of Miotragocerus, Tragocerus and Tragoportax. Fossils of Miotragoceros are not apparent in Africa (only M. cyrenaicus has been reported from the continent), but have significant presence in the Shiwalik Hills in India and Pakistan, as do several Tragoportax species. A 2005 study suggested the migration of Miotragoceros to eastern Asia around 8 Mya. Alan W. Gentry of the Natural History Museum reported the presence of another boselaphine, Mesembriportax, from Langebaanweg (South Africa).

Evidence of early humans hunting four-horned antelope during the Mesolithic period (5,000 to 8,000 years ago) have been found in the Kurnool caves of southern India and similar evidence has been found from the Chalcolithic period (3,000 years ago) in Orissa, eastern India.

== Description ==
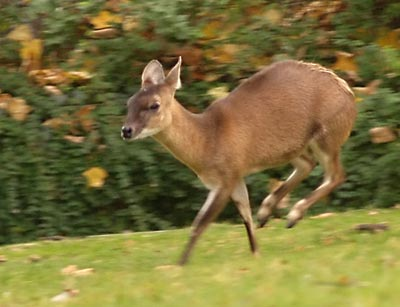
Doe

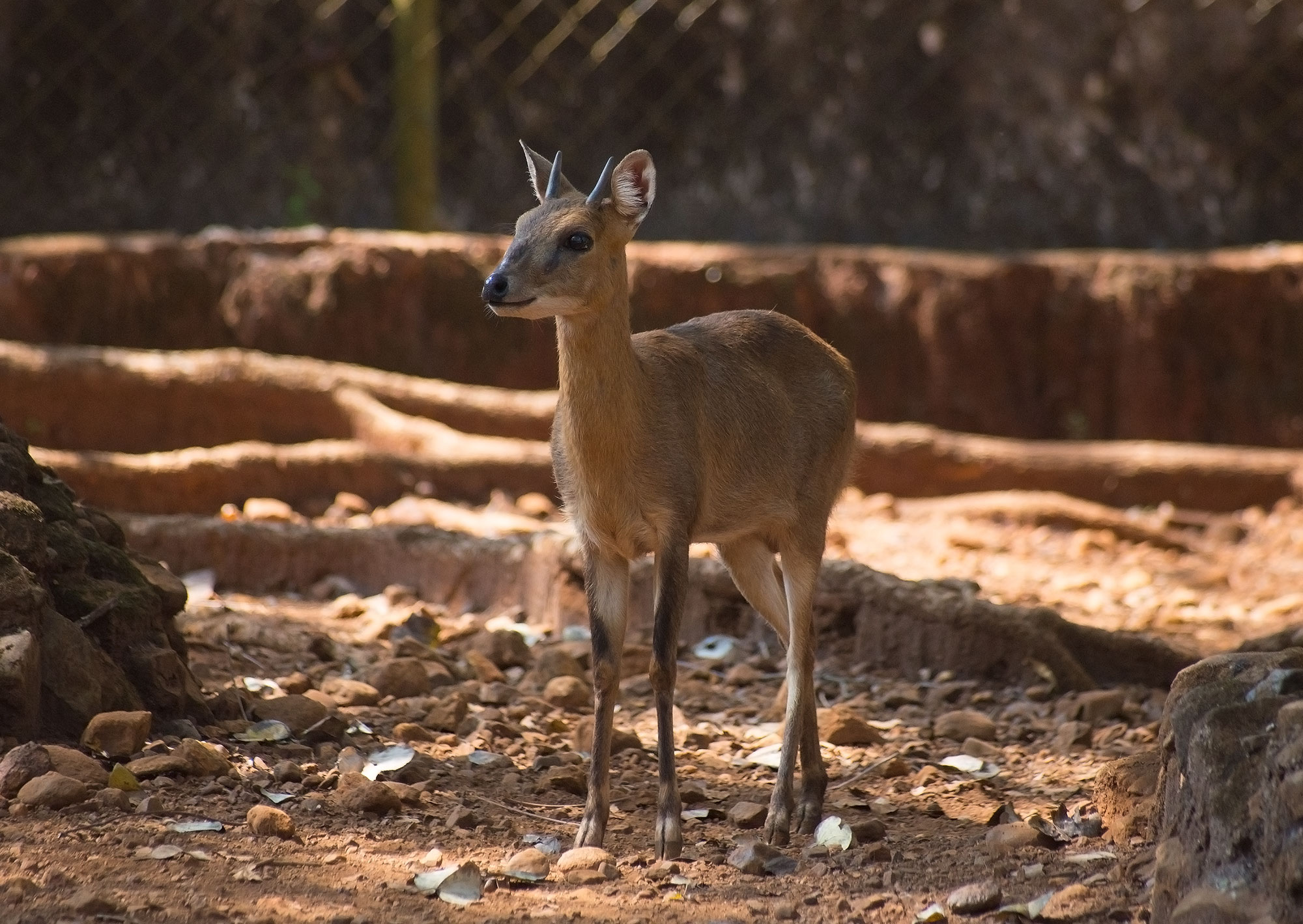
Buck

The four-horned antelope is one of the smallest Asian bovids. The number of its horns distinguishes it from most of the other bovids, that have two horns The four-horned antelope stands 55–64 centimetres (22–25 in) at the shoulder and weighs 17–22 kilograms (37–49 lb); the head-and-body length is typically between 80 and 110 centimetres (31 and 43 in). Sexual dimorphism is not very notable, though only males possess horns.

Slender with thin legs and a short tail, the four-horned antelope has a yellowish brown to reddish coat. The underparts and the insides of the legs are white. Facial features include black markings on the muzzle and behind the ears. A black stripe marks the outer surface of each leg. Females have four teats far back on the abdomen. The hair feels coarse, more like that of a deer than the glossy hair typical of antelopes. The fetlocks are marked with white patches.

One pair of horns is located between the ears, and the other on the forehead. The posterior horns are always longer than the anterior horns, which might be mere fur-covered studs. While the posterior horns each measures 8–12 centimetres (3.1–4.7 in), the anterior ones measure 2–5 centimetres (0.79–1.97 in). Horns emerge at 10 to 14 months. According to Groves, anterior horns show the poorest development in the subspecies T. q. subquadricornutus. These horns measure nearly 4.5–5 centimetres (1.8–2.0 in) in T. q. quadricornis, and nearly 1.5–2.5 centimetres (0.59–0.98 in) in T. q. iodes. The posterior horn lengths for the subspecies recorded by him were: 8–10 centimetres (3.1–3.9 in) for T. q. quadricornis, 6.5–7.5 centimetres (2.6–3.0 in) in T. q. iodes and 1.8–2 centimetres (0.71–0.79 in) in T. q. subquadricornutus.

The four-horned antelope differs greatly from the nilgai in colour, is much smaller and has an extra pair of horns. The nilgai is nearly nine times heavier and two times taller than the four-horned antelope. Two deer species, the Indian muntjac and the Indian hog deer, can be confused with this antelope. The four-horned antelope, however, lacks their antlers. The chinkara, a gazelle, can be told apart by its light brown coat and larger, ringed horns.

== Ecology and behaviour ==
The four-horned antelope is diurnal (active mainly during the day), though it mainly rests or ruminates in dense undergrowth at noon. Though solitary by nature, the four-horned antelope may form loose groups of three to five. Groups consist of one or more adults, sometimes accompanied by juveniles. Males and females hardly interact, except in the mating season.

The antelope is shy and elusive. When alarmed, it stands motionless and may nervously leap away from the danger or even sprint. It often conceals itself in tall grasses to escape predators. The use of alarm calls to alert others is not common because the antelope tries to avoid the attention of predators. However, in extreme cases, these calls may be used to warn predators that they have been identified. Adults mark vegetation in their territories with a colourless secretion of preorbital glands, that soon condenses to form a white film. They maintain multiple latrine sites where piles of their pellet droppings are formed by regular use. Latrine sites can be confused with those of the barking deer but the pellets are longer and larger in four-horned antelopes. Submissive display consists of shrinking the body, lowering the head and pulling the ears back. Predators of four-horned antelopes include tigers, leopards, and dholes.

=== Diet ===
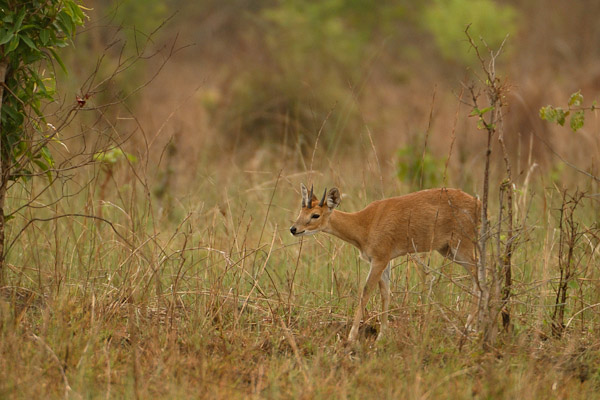
Four-horned antelope prefer habitats with dense undergrowth and tall grasses.

The four-horned antelope feeds on grasses, herbs, shrubs, foliage, flowers and fruits. A study in Mudumalai National Park (Tamil Nadu, India) showed that the antelope prefers grass species of the family Cyperaceae; genera Axonopus, Cynodon, Digitaria, Echinochloa, Panicum, Sehima and Sporobolus; and the species Imperata cylindrica, Ottochloa nodosa, Pseudanthistria umbellata and Themeda cymbaria. The shrub Grewia hirsuta is frequently eaten. Preferred herbs include Helichrysum, Indigofera and Tinospora species and Leucas aspera. The four-horned antelope feeds on the leaves of trees such as Cordia wallichii, Emblica officinalis, Randia dumetorum and Zizyphus xylopyrus. Grasses comprise nearly 29 percent of the diet, followed by foliage from trees (nearly nine percent). Grass and browse were consumed in nearly equal proportions. A study in the Panna National Park (Madhya Pradesh, India) showed preference for Zizyphus mauritiana, Acacia nilotica, A. leucophloea and A. catechu. Babool flowers were frequently eaten. The antelope often associates with langurs under fruiting trees, just as chital frequently do. Interaction with chital, a sympatric species, was infrequent. The antelope is wary when feeding, often raising its head and looking about its vicinity. The four-horned antelope needs to drink water frequently; as such it stays in places near water sources.

=== Reproduction ===
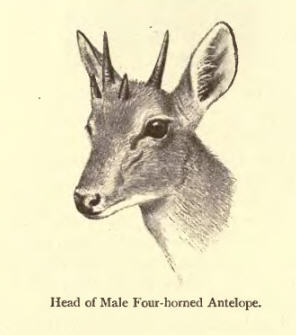
illustration of the head from 1903.

Breeding behaviour of the four-horned antelope has not been well studied. The age at which sexual maturity is gained is doubted; two captive females had their first parturition at less than two years. The breeding season in Panna National Park probably lasts from May to July, and from June to August in Mudumalai National Park. The male approaches the female in a relaxed gait, giving out low coughs. The two may kneel and push against each other with the necks intertwined. The male makes a few short mounting attempts; the female may be foraging all the while without any reaction. Gestation lasts about eight months, followed by the birth of one or two calves. The newborn has a head-and-body length of 42 to 46 cm (17 to 18 in), and weighs 0.7 to 1.1 kg (1.5 to 2.4 lb). Juveniles are kept concealed for the first few weeks of birth. Births in Mudumalai National Park peak from February to April. Juveniles remain with their mothers for about a year.

== Distribution and habitat ==
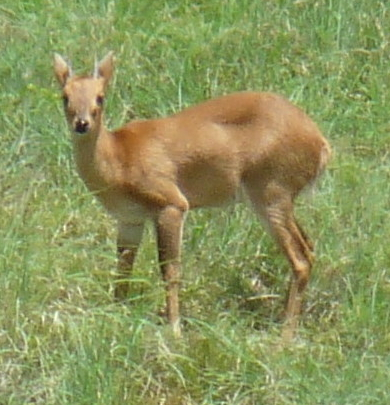
Male four-horned antelope in the Nilgiri Biosphere Reserve

The four-horned antelope is confined to the Indian subcontinent, occurring widely in disjunct and small populations. It ranges from the foothills of the Himalayas in the north to the Deccan Plateau in the south. Most of the existing populations lives in India, and lower numbers in adjoining Nepal. Observations have been logged from the states of Andhra Pradesh, Chhattisgarh, Gujarat, Karnataka, Madhya Pradesh, Maharashtra and Telangana on iNaturalist.org's biodiversity database. It inhabits open, dry deciduous forests in flat to hilly terrain. It prefers areas close to water that are covered with grasses or heavy undergrowth, for security. As many Ungulates are skittish by nature, the chousingha, notably, generally keeps away from human settlements; research suggests that human activities, construction, and feral dogs all adversely affect chousingha numbers, thus areas of less human habitation support more stable chousingha populations.

The four-horned antelope was once common throughout deciduous forests in India, but the population has declined over time. In 2001, it was estimated to comprise about 10,000 mature individuals, with a decreasing trend. Numbers in Gir National Park were estimated at 256 individuals in 1974; later estimates at waterholes in the same locations put them slightly over 1,000 individuals, and a population density of above 0.7 individuals per 1 km^{2} (0.39 sq mi) was considered to be healthy.

== Threats and conservation ==
The four-horned antelope is classified as vulnerable on the IUCN Red List. It is threatened by the loss of its natural habitat due to agricultural expansion. Its four-horned skull and the horns have been targeted by trophy hunters.

The four-horned antelope is protected under Schedule I of the Indian Wildlife Protection Act of 1972; the population in Nepal is listed in CITES Appendix III. Major protected areas in India where four-horned antelopes occur include:

- Gir National Park in Gujarat;
- Sariska Tiger Reserve in Rajasthan;
- Bandhavgarh National Park, Bori Wildlife Sanctuary, Kanha National Park, Pachmarhi Biosphere Reserve, Panna Tiger Reserve, Pench Tiger Reserve, Sanjay National Park, Satpura National Park in Madhya Pradesh;
- Tadoba Andhari Reserve in Maharashtra;
- Kumbhalgarh Wildlife Sanctuary, Ranthambore National Park, Rangayyanadurga Four–horned antelope Wildlife Sanctuary in Karnataka.
