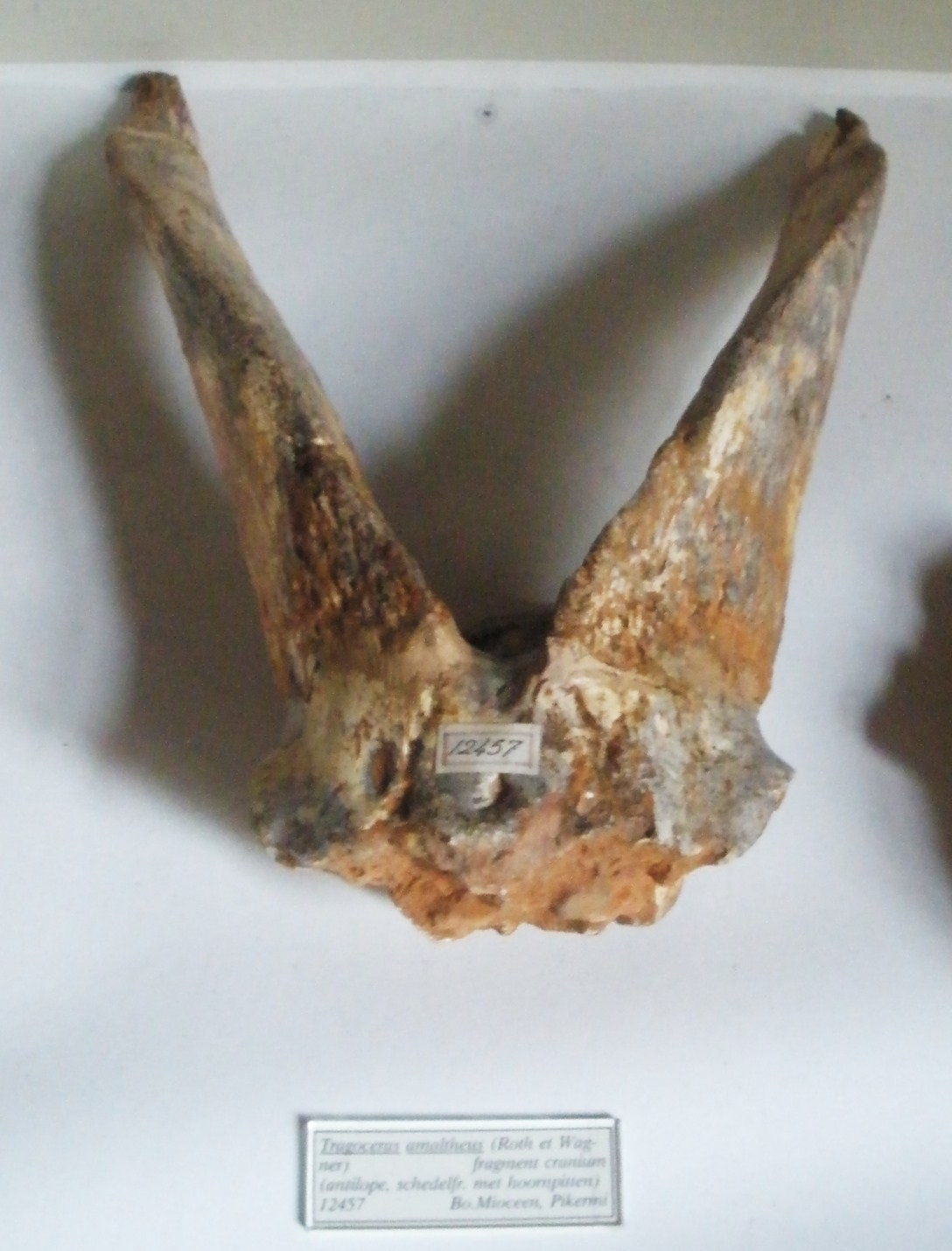

Scientific classification
- Kingdom: Animalia
- Phylum: Chordata
- Class: Mammalia
- Infraclass: Placentalia
- Order: Artiodactyla
- Family: Bovidae
- Subfamily: Bovinae
- Tribe: †Tragoportacini; Bibi et al., 2009

Genera
- †Austroportax; †Kipsigicerus; †Miotragocerus; †Protragocerus; †Strepsiportax; †Tragoportax; †Parabos?; †Alephis?

= Tragoportacini =

Tragoportacini Temporal range: Miocene–Pliocene 11.1–4.9 Ma

Extinct tribe of mammals

Tragoportacini is a tribe of extinct bovines that first appeared during the Late Miocene and persisted into the Early Pliocene.

== Classification ==
Tragoportacini is a tribe of Bovinae, closely related to Boselaphini, a tribe consisting of the extant nilgai (Boselaphus tragocamelus) and four-horned antelope (Tetracerus quadricornis). Originally, tragoportacines were classified within Boselaphinae, though in 2009 they were split off into a tribe of their own. The tribe consists of six genera: Austroportax, Kipsigicerus, Miotragocerus, Protragocerus, Strepsiportax and Tragoportax, as well as possibly Parabos and Alephis.
