= Diaphorolepis =

Scientific classification
- Kingdom: Animalia
- Phylum: Chordata
- Class: Reptilia
- Order: Squamata
- Suborder: Serpentes
- Family: Colubridae
- Subfamily: Dipsadinae
- Genus: Diaphorolepis; Jan, 1863

Genus of snakes

Diaphorolepis is a genus of snakes in the family Colubridae. The genus is indigenous to northwestern South America.

== Species ==
The genus Diaphorolepis contains the following two species which are recognized as being valid.

- Diaphorolepis laevis F. Werner, 1923 – Colombian frog-eating snake
- Diaphorolepis wagneri Jan, 1863 – Ecuador frog-eating snake, Ecuadorean frog-eating snake

== Etymology ==
The specific name, wagneri, is in honor of German paleontologist Johann Andreas Wagner.
