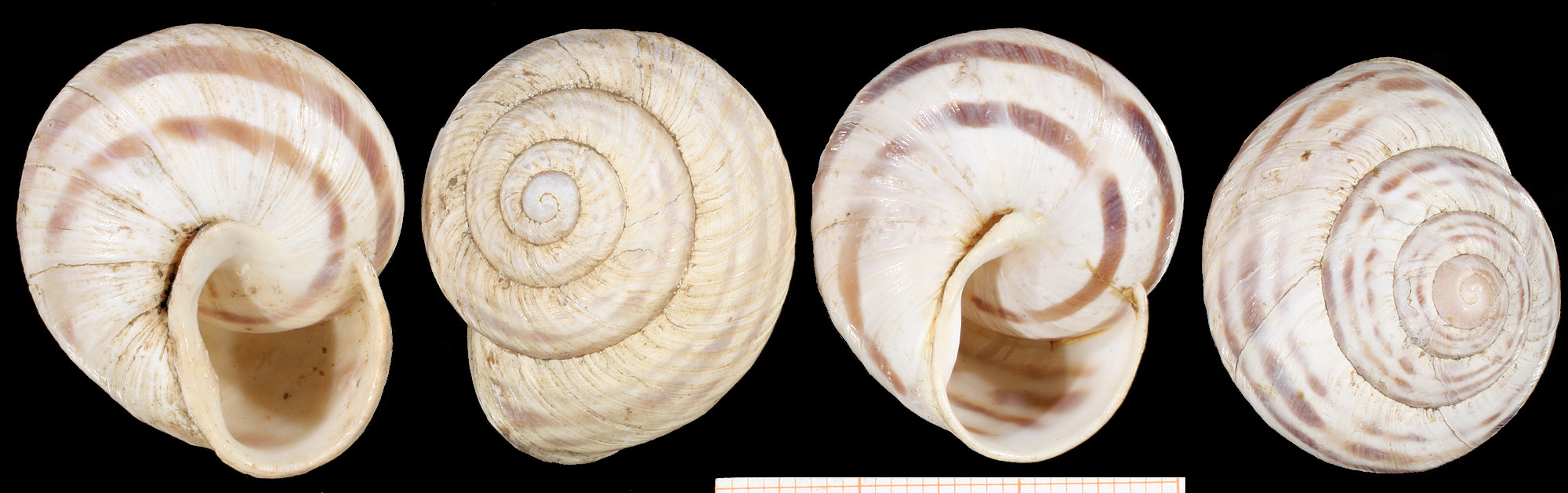

Conservation status
- Vulnerable (IUCN 3.1)

Scientific classification
- Kingdom: Animalia
- Phylum: Mollusca
- Class: Gastropoda
- Order: Stylommatophora
- Family: Helicidae
- Genus: Codringtonia
- Species: C. parnassia

Binomial name
- Codringtonia parnassia (Roth, 1855)

Synonyms
- Codringtonia oetae (Kobelt, 1879); Codringtonia pseudoparnassia (Kobelt, 1879); Helix parnassia Roth, 1855; Helix sylvatica Var. Parnassia Roth, 1855 (orig. spelling)

= Codringtonia parnassia =

Species of gastropod

Codringtonia parnassia is a species of air-breathing land snail, a terrestrial pulmonate gastropod mollusc in the family Helicidae, the typical snails.

== Geographic distribution ==
Codringtonia parnassia is endemic to Greece, where it occurs in the central part of the country.
