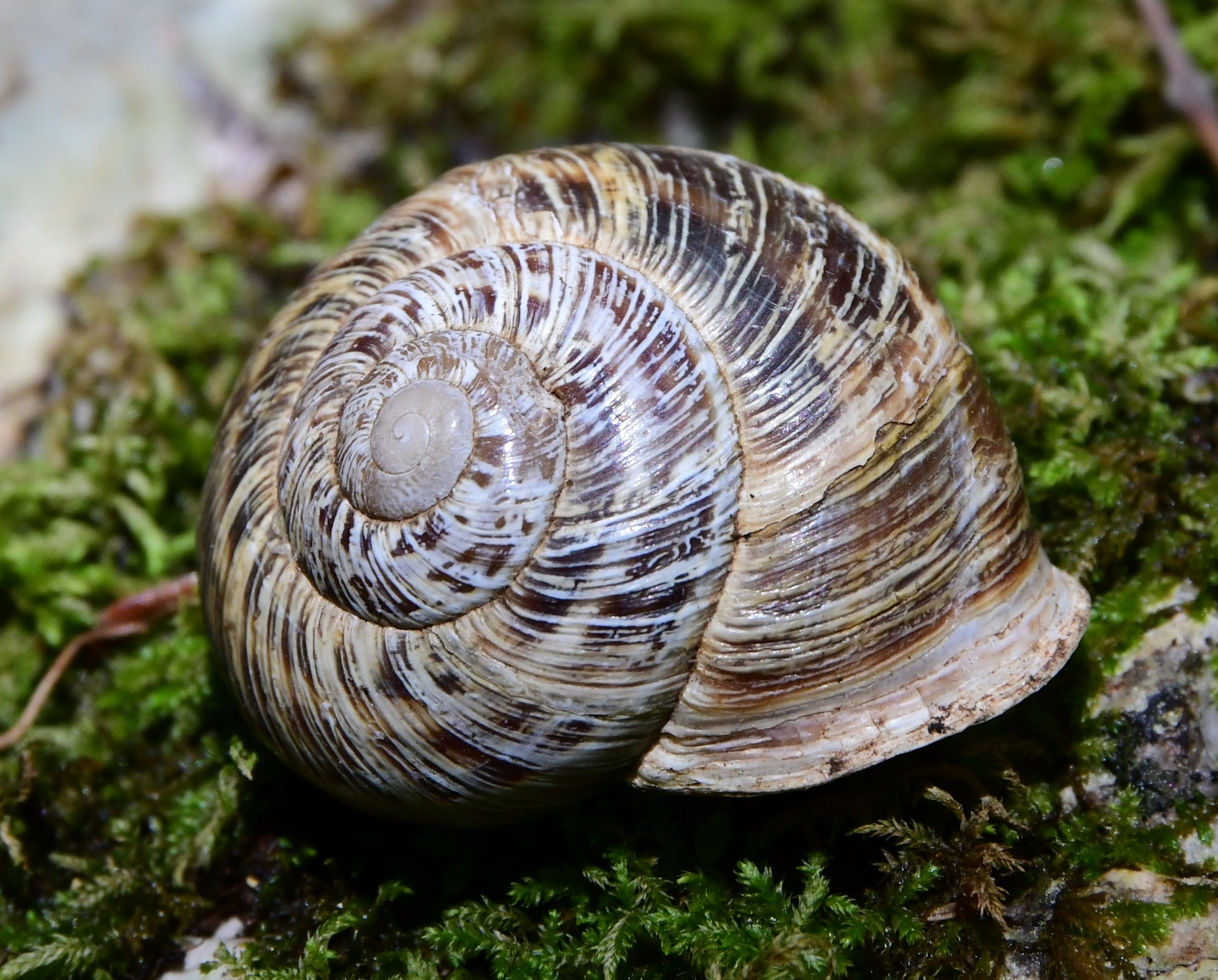
- Codringtonia codringtonii in the wild in Greece

Conservation status
- Endangered (IUCN 3.1)

Scientific classification
- Kingdom: Animalia
- Phylum: Mollusca
- Class: Gastropoda
- Order: Stylommatophora
- Family: Helicidae
- Genus: Codringtonia
- Species: C. codringtonii

Binomial name
- Codringtonia codringtonii (Gray, 1834)

Synonyms
- Codringtonia (Codringtonia) codringtonii (Gray, 1834); Codringtonia (Codringtonia) gittenbergeri Subai, 2005; Codringtonia gittenbergeri Subai, 2005; Helix codringtonii J. E. Gray, 1834; Helix avariensis L. Pfeiffer, 1848

= Rock snail =

Species of gastropod

The rock snail, scientific name Codringtonia codringtonii, is a species of air-breathing land snail, a terrestrial pulmonate gastropod mollusk in the family Helicidae, the typical snails.

== Geographic distribution ==
C. codringtonii is endemic to Greece, where it occurs in the south-western part of the Peloponnese.
