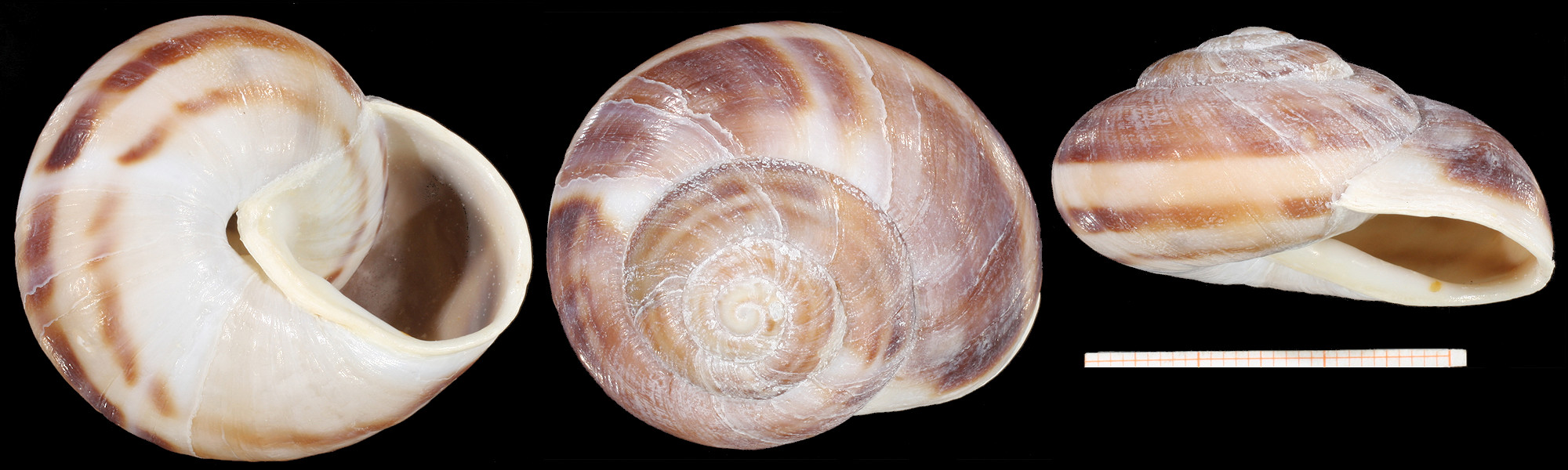
- Codringtonia elisabethae shells

Scientific classification
- Kingdom: Animalia
- Phylum: Mollusca
- Class: Gastropoda
- Order: Stylommatophora
- Family: Helicidae
- Tribe: Helicini
- Genus: Codringtonia; Kobelt, 1898

Type species
- Codringtonia codringtonii (J. E. Gray, 1834)

Species
- Codringtonia codringtonii (J.E.Gray, 1834); Codringtonia elisabethae Subai, 2005; Codringtonia eucineta (Bourguignat, 1857); Codringtonia helenae Subai, 2005; Codringtonia intusplicata (L.Pfeiffer, 1851); Codringtonia parnassia (J.R.Roth, 1855)

Synonyms
- Codringtonia (Codringtonia) Kobelt, 1898; Helix (Codringtonia) Kobelt, 1898

= Codringtonia =

Genus of gastropods

Codringtonia is a genus of air-breathing land snails, terrestrial pulmonate gastropod mollusks in the family Helicidae, the typical snails.

== Species ==
Species within the genus Codringtonia include:

Subgenus Codringtonia Kobelt, 1898

- Codringtonia codringtonii (Gray, 1834) – rock snail – type species
- Codringtonia elisabethae Subai, 2005
- Codringtonia eucineta (Bourguignat, 1857)
- Codringtonia gittenbergeri Subai, 2005
- Codringtonia helenae Subai, 2005
- Codringtonia intusplicata (Pfeiffer, 1851)
- Codringtonia parnassia (Roth, 1855)

Subgenus Neocrassa Subai, 2005

- Codringtonia neocrassa Zilch, 1952
