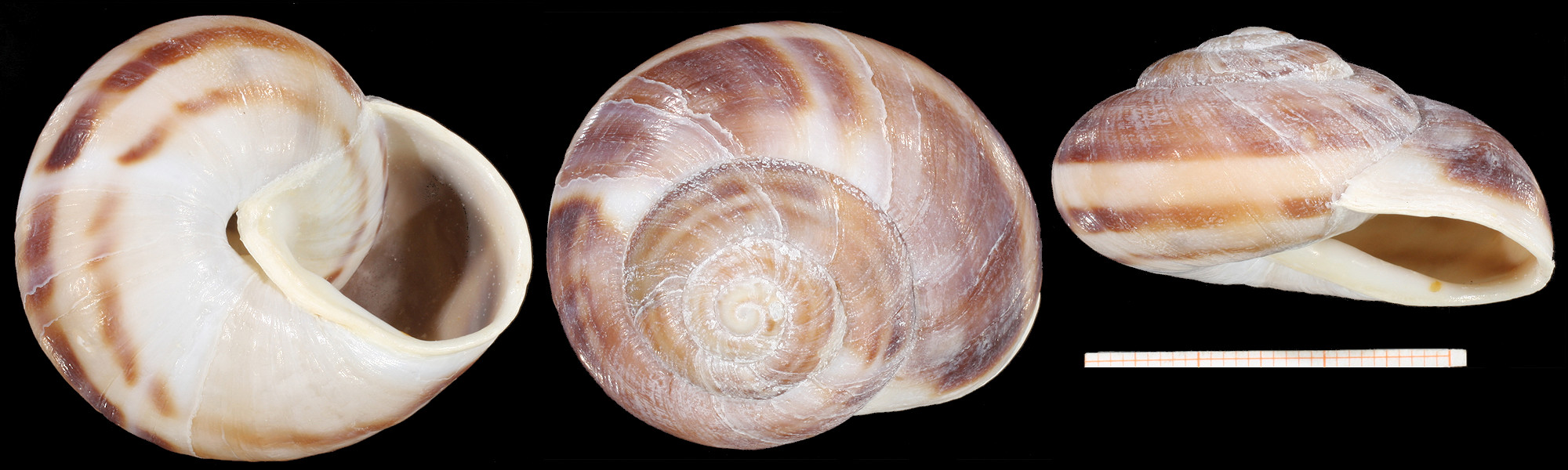

Conservation status
- Vulnerable (IUCN 3.1)

Scientific classification
- Kingdom: Animalia
- Phylum: Mollusca
- Class: Gastropoda
- Order: Stylommatophora
- Family: Helicidae
- Genus: Codringtonia
- Species: C. elisabethae

Binomial name
- Codringtonia elisabethae Subai, 2005

= Codringtonia elisabethae =

Species of gastropod

Codringtonia elisabethae is a species of air-breathing land snail.

It is a terrestrial pulmonate gastropod mollusc in the family of Helicidae, the typical snails.

== Geographic distribution ==
Codringtonia elisabethae is endemic to Greece, where it occurs in the north-eastern part of the Peloponnese.
