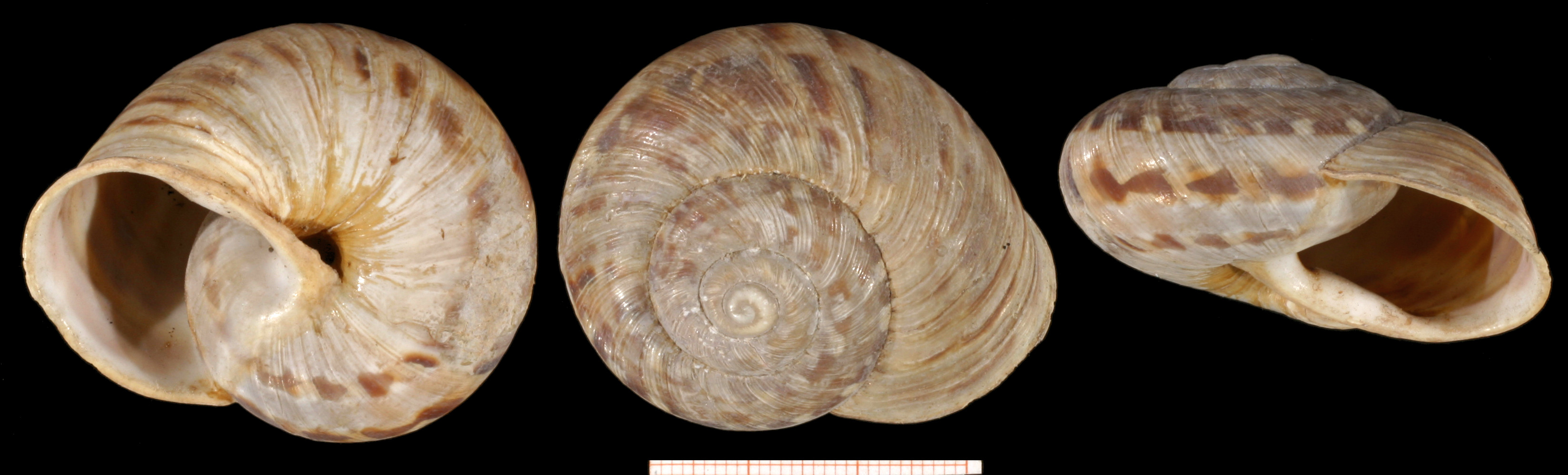

Conservation status
- Vulnerable (IUCN 3.1)

Scientific classification
- Kingdom: Animalia
- Phylum: Mollusca
- Class: Gastropoda
- Order: Stylommatophora
- Family: Helicidae
- Genus: Codringtonia
- Species: C. eucineta

Binomial name
- Codringtonia eucineta (Bourguignat, 1857)

Synonyms
- Codringtonia (Codringtonia) eucineta (Bourguignat, 1857); Helix eucineta Bourguignat, 1857

= Codringtonia eucineta =

Species of gastropod

Codringtonia eucineta is a species of air-breathing land snail, a terrestrial pulmonate gastropod mollusc in the family Helicidae, the typical snails.

== Geographic distribution ==
C. eucineta is endemic to Greece, where it occurs in the central part of south Peloponnese and in Evrytania.
