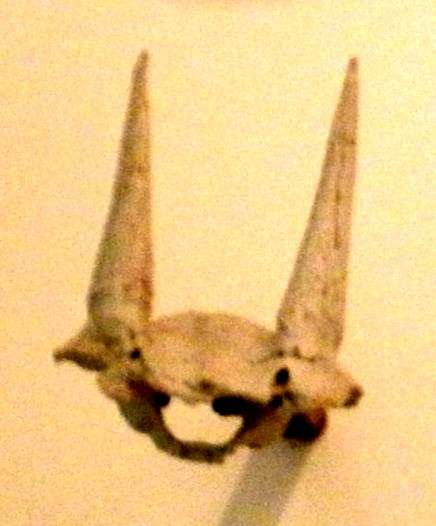
- Eotragus sansaniensis
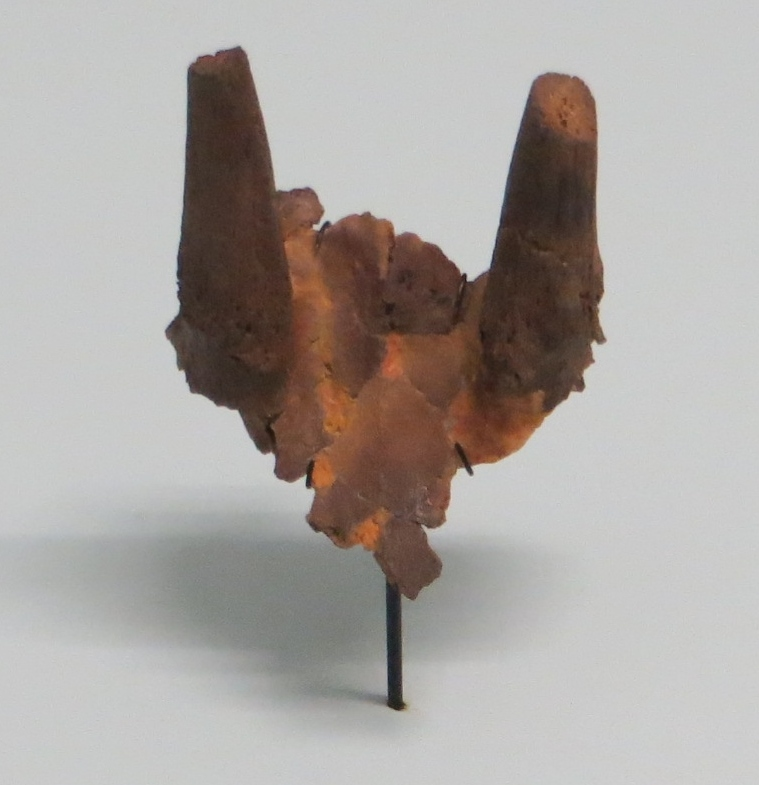

Scientific classification
- Kingdom: Animalia
- Phylum: Chordata
- Class: Mammalia
- Order: Artiodactyla
- Family: Bovidae
- Subfamily: Bovinae
- Tribe: Boselaphini
- Genus: †Eotragus; Pilgrim, 1939

Species
- †E. sansaniensis; †E. cristatus; †E. halamagaiensis; †E. noyei; †E. artenensis

= Eotragus =

Eotragus Temporal range: Early Miocene

Extinct genus of mammals

Eotragus is an extinct genus of early bovid. Members of this genus had a wide range inhabiting Europe, Africa, and Asia during the Miocene around 20-18 million years ago. It is related to the modern nilgai and four-horned antelope. It was small and probably lived in woodland environments.

== Discovery ==
E. sansaniensis was first described in 1851 by Édouard Lartet, after fossil remains including teeth and a partial skull were unearthed from the Sansan paleontological site southwestern France. It was initially assigned the scientific name Antilope sansaniensis, before later being assigned to the new genus Eotragus once it was understood to be an early bovid.

== Distribution ==
Eotragus has a wide range being found on many of the old world continents (Europe, Asia and Africa). In Europe, it can be found in central Europe, France, and Spain. In Asia, they can be found in Israel, Pakistan, Mongolia, and Thailand. The only known remains of Eotragus possibly living in Africa have been found in Kenya although its assignment to this genus is ambiguous.

=== Asia ===
Several teeth fossils dated from 5-7 million years ago attributed to Eotragus have been found in middle Siwaliks. Fossils have also been found in the Loh Formation in Mongolia.

==== China ====
It may have lived in China however there are no reliable evidence of Eotragus being found in China. Type material that was attributed to Eotragus halamagaiensis found in Halamagai Formation, China have been shown that it instead belongs to Turcocerus halamagaiensis. While the material is similar to the morphology of Eotragus, it differed with its slight homonymous torsion that is visible along the course of the anterior rib, well-developed posterior and posterolateral grooves on the horn cores. Further evidence for its reassignment can be seen with the weak inclination of the horn cones and its short lower cheek teeth having a considerably shortened premolar row.

=== Africa ===
The existence of Eotragus in Africa is currently ambiguous. There is a 13.7 million year old horn core known as KNM 63.340 discovered in Fort Ternan, Kenya. Also discovered have been two 15 million year old partial bovid crania named NHMUK M 15543 and NHMUK M 15544 that have been discovered in Maboko. NHMUK M 15543 was previously considered belonging to a climacoceratid by Thomas (1984) before being placed in the subfamily Hypsodontinae by Gentry (2010) and Morales et al. (2003). NHMUK M 15544 is morphologically similar to Homoiodorcas tugenium. In Gebel Zelten, Libya, there may be two horn cores of Eotragus (NHMUK M 26688 and NHMUK M 26689) dated to around 16.5 million years ago. However the medially convergent horn cores and the presence of a slight twist along the horn core axis make their assignment to this genus unlikely with it possibly belonging to the subfamily hypsodontine.

== Taxonomy ==
The genus contains at least five species, E. sansaniensis, E. cristatus, E. halamagaiensis, E. noyei and E. artenensis. The genus belongs to a taxonomic tribe of bovids known as Boselaphini meaning that it is closely related to the modern nilgai (Boselaphus tragocamelus) and the four-horned antelope (Tetracerus quadricornis).

=== Evolutionary history ===
It is one of the oldest known bovids living during the Miocene epoch around 20-18 million years ago with Eotragus clavatus being one of the oldest known.

== Description ==
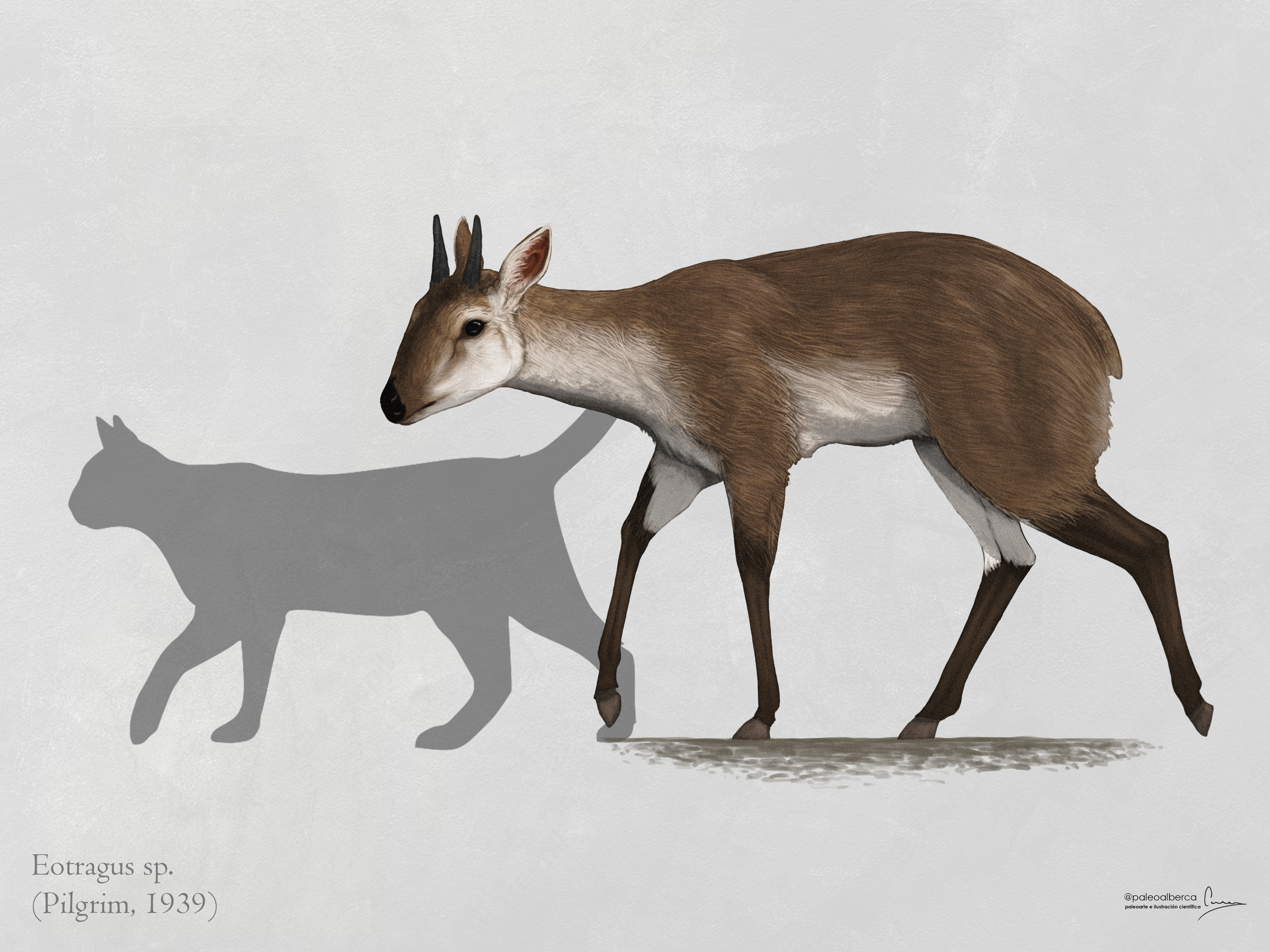
Comparative scale between Eotragus and a domestic cat

Eotragus was a small bovid with a scimitar-shaped horn cone. They had short, almost straight horn cores with concave anterior margins and convex posterior margins. They are also characterized by a horn core with an asymmetrical and triangular outline in lateral view. The anterior portion of the base of the horn cone is inclined posteriorly at about 40° degrees. Horn cone cross sections show that it has a slight oval shape that is often associated with a weak anterior keel.

=== Eotragus artenensis ===
It is one of the oldest members of tits genus to be found in Europe living around 18 million years ago in Artenay in France, Corcoles and Guadalajara in Spain and Quinta Do Narigao in Portugal.

=== Eotragus clavatus ===
It is one of the oldest members of this genus and had a larger size. It lived during the early to middle Miocene epoch. It is widely distributed across Europe being found in Spain, France, Germany and Serbia.

=== Eotragus haplodon ===
It lived during the Middle Miocene epoch being found in several locations such as Neudorf Sandberg in Slovakia, Göriach and Gamlitz in Austria, and Sansan in France.

=== Eotragus lampangensis ===
This species was similar in size to Eotragus artenensis. It differed from other species with it having a more vertically inserted and more laterally inclined horn core, as well as in the slender shape and comparatively great height of the horn core. It was discovered in the Q and K coal layers of the Mae Moh coal mine. It was named after the location which the fossil material that described it was found in, the Lampang Province of Northern Thailand.

=== Eotragus minus ===
It is the smallest species living in during the early Miocene at Dera Bugti, Pakistan.

=== Eotragus noyei ===
It lived in the Pakistan at the Kamlial Formation about 18.3–18.0 million years ago during the early Miocene and the Vihowa Formation around 17 million years ago during the early middle Miocene. It had a larger, longer, and more slender horn core with a subcircular cross section.

== Palaeobiology ==
=== Diet ===
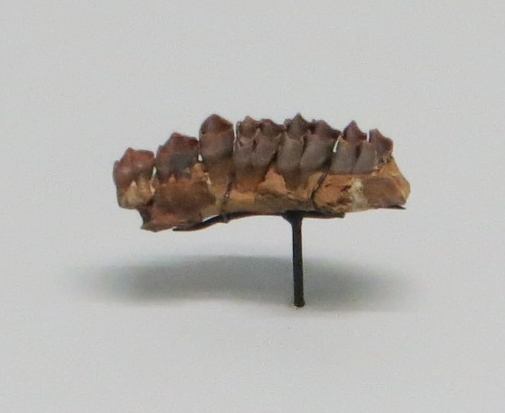
Fossil teeth of Eotragus sansaniensis

E. lampangensis, based on δ^{13}C studies, inhabited habitats intermediate between forest and grassland. Comparative analysis of dental microwear of seventeen extant species of ungulates of variouse feeding types (browsing, feeder and grazing) suggests that Eotragus was most likely a browser similar to the greater kudu (Tragelaphus strepsiceros) as opposed to a grazer. Evidence for this can be seen with the number of pits and scratches on their teeth. Browsers tend to have more pits, fewer total scratches, and more cross scratches while grazers have fewer pits, more total scratches, and fewer cross scratches.

=== Life history ===
Enamel histology performed on the mandibular molars of E. noyei shows that the species had a rapid daily secretion rate of enamel, suggesting a fast life history overall.
