= Codringtonia helenae =

Conservation status
- Vulnerable (IUCN 3.1)

Scientific classification
- Kingdom: Animalia
- Phylum: Mollusca
- Class: Gastropoda
- Order: Stylommatophora
- Family: Helicidae
- Genus: Codringtonia
- Species: C. helenae

Binomial name
- Codringtonia helenae Subai, 2005

Species of gastropod

Codringtonia helenae is a species of air-breathing land snail, a terrestrial pulmonate gastropod mollusc in the family Helicidae, the typical snails.

== Geographic distribution ==
Codringtonia helenae is endemic to Greece, where it occurs in the central part of Peloponnese.
