= Johann Andreas Wagner =

German palaeontologist, zoologist and archaeologist

- Born: 21 March 1797; Nuremberg, Germany
- Died: 17 December 1861 (aged 64)

Academic work
- Discipline: palaeontology zoology archaeology
- Institutions: Ludwig-Maximilians-Universität München; Zoologische Staatssammlung
- Notable works: "Roth & Wagner" textbook

Johann Andreas Wagner (21 March 1797 – 17 December 1861) was a German palaeontologist, zoologist and archaeologist who wrote several important works on palaeontology. He was also a pioneer of biogeographical theory.

== Career ==
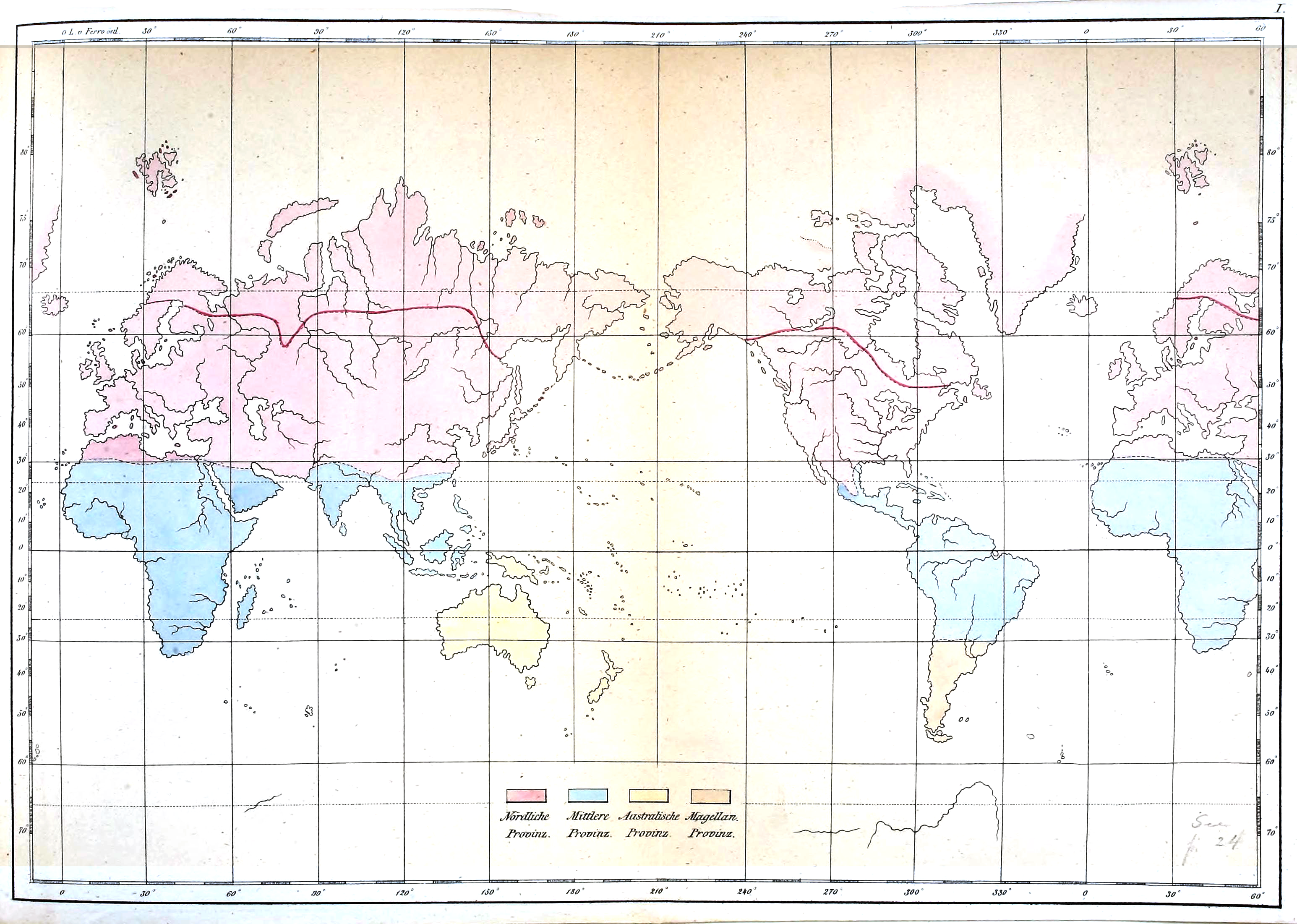
The oldest biogeographical map. Wagner indicated the northern, the equatorial, the Australian and the Magellan provinces (southern South America)

Wagner was born in Nuremberg and received a PhD from the University of Erlangen in 1826 after spending some time in the University of Würzburg from 1814 to 1816. He worked as a privatdozent at the University of Erlangen after a tour that included a visit to Paris. In 1832, he became an adjunct to Gotthilf Heinrich von Schubert at the Munich zoological collection. In 1835, he was elected to the Royal Bavarian Academy of Sciences and Humanities. In 1845, he organized a survey of the distributions of 44 vertebrates (16 mammals, 27 birds, 1 reptile) across the districts of Bavaria under auspices of the Kingdom of Bavaria. In 1849, he was made third curator for the zoological collections. He was the author of Die Geographische Verbreitung der Säugethiere Dargestellt (1844–1846). In this work he recognized the zone around Mexico, Honduras and Nicaragua as being occupied by a mix of Nearctic and Neotropical fauna. This had also been suggested by Karl Illiger and Heinrich Lichtenstein. But Wagner produced some of the earliest biogeographical maps. He also published the South American mollusc work of Von Spix.

Wagner was a Christian creationist. In his theory on the distributions of mammals he assumed a single flood based on which he explained his fossil finds. He pointed out the history of domestic animals supported ideas in the Bible of a repopulation of the earth from around Mount Ararat.

== Pikermi ==
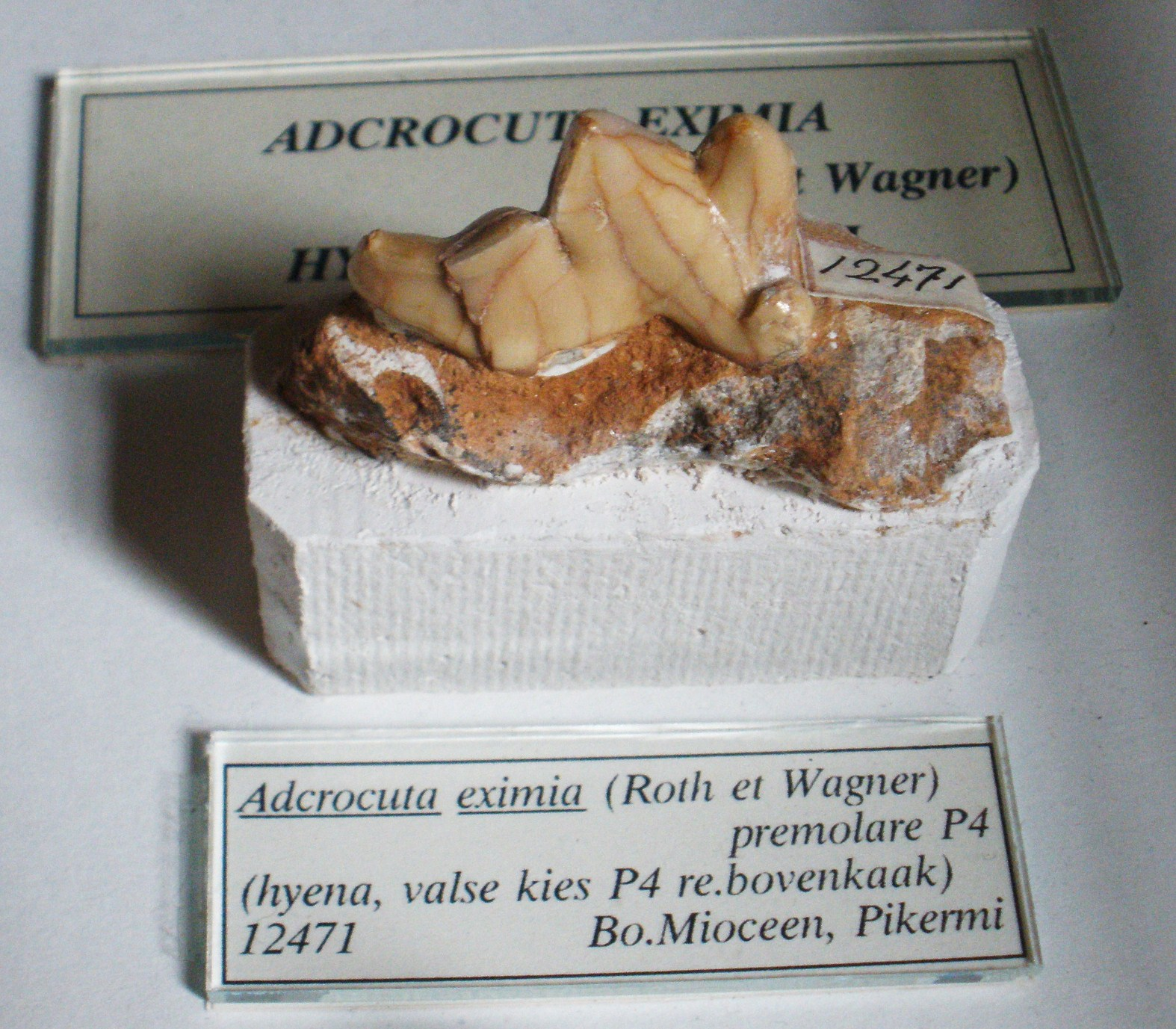
Pikermi fossil of a hyena tooth Adcrocuta eximia, showing the characteristic craquelure, Teylers Museum.

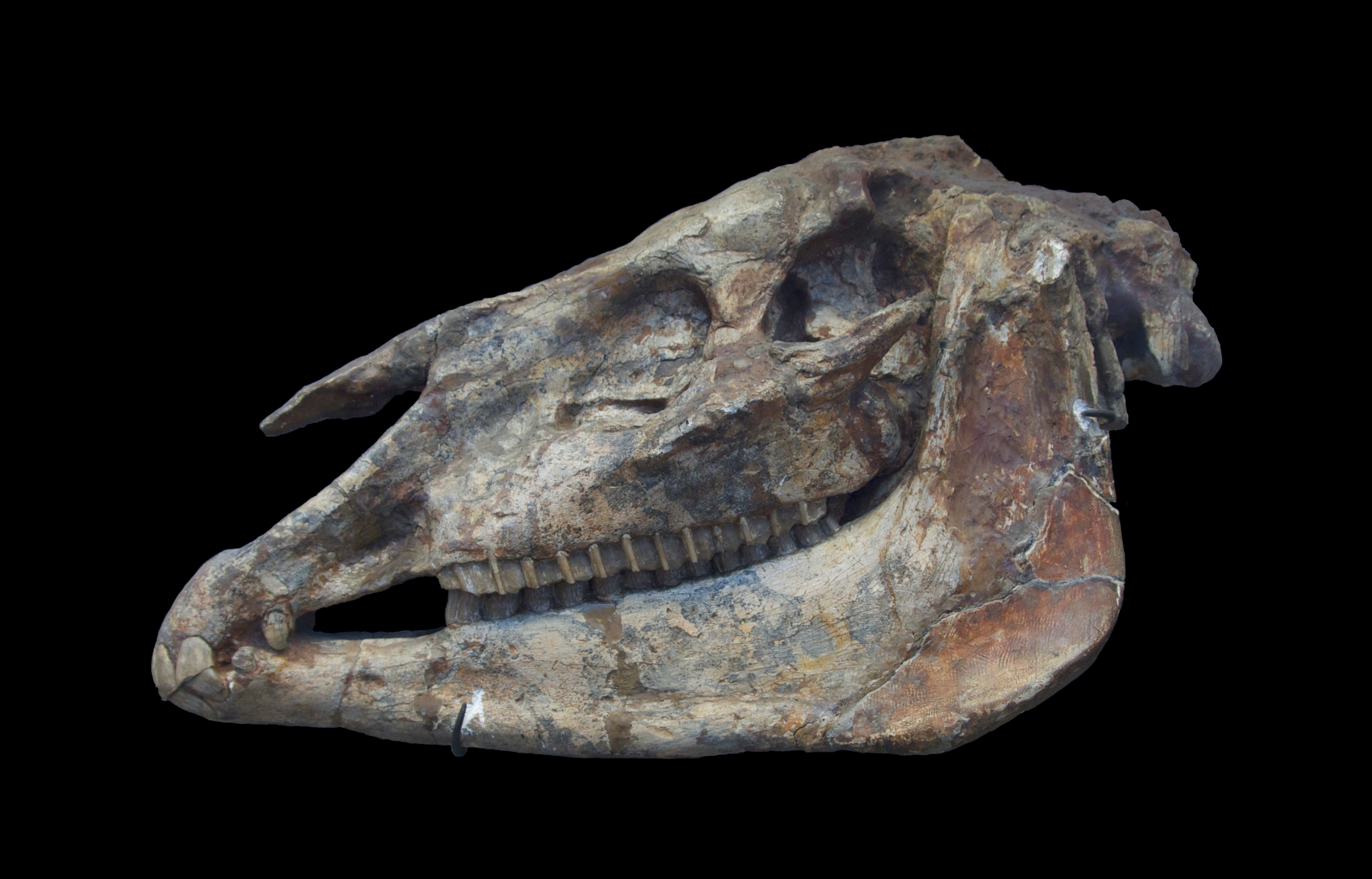
Hipparion from Pikermi, Museum National d'Histoire Naturelle, Paris.

In his travels to the fossil beds of Pikermi, Wagner discovered and described fossil remains of mastodon, Dinotherium, Hipparion, two species of giraffe, antelope and others. His collaboration with Johannes Roth on these fossils became a major textbook in palaeontology, known as "Roth & Wagner", in which the "bones were much broken, and no complete skeleton was found with all the parts united".

== Legacy ==
Wagner is commemorated in the scientific name of a species of South American snake, Diaphorolepis wagneri.

== Bibliography ==
- (in German) 1844–1846. Die Geographische Verbreitung der Säugethiere Dargestellt.
- (in German) Johann Andreas Wagner 1897. Monographie der gattung Pomatias Studer.
