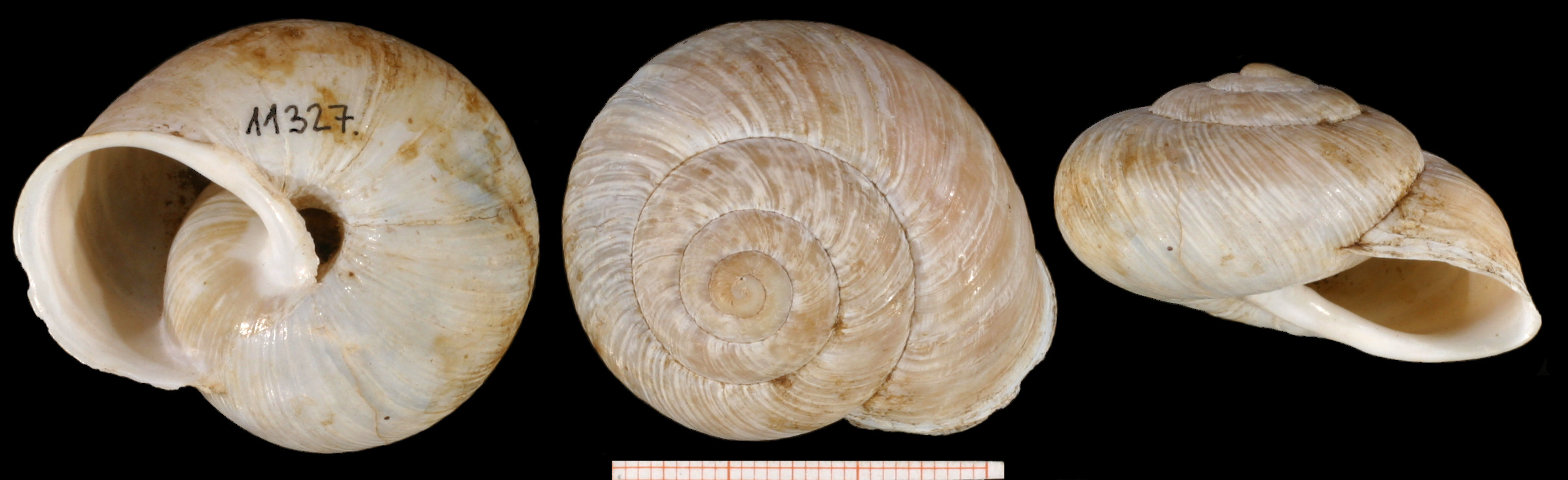

Conservation status
- Near Threatened (IUCN 3.1)

Scientific classification
- Kingdom: Animalia
- Phylum: Mollusca
- Class: Gastropoda
- Order: Stylommatophora
- Family: Helicidae
- Tribe: Helicini
- Genus: Neocrassa; Subai, 2005
- Species: N. neocrassa

Binomial name
- Neocrassa neocrassa (Zilch, 1952)

Synonyms
- Helix crassa Pfeiffer, 1850; Codringtonia neocrassa Zilch, 1952

= Neocrassa =

Monotypic genus of land snails

Neocrassa is a monotypic genus of large, air-breathing land snails native to Epirus and Kerkyra in northwestern Greece and to southern Albania. It contains a single species, Neocrassa neocrassa.

Originally described as a subgenus of Codringtonia, Neocrassa was elevated to genus level following molecular phylogenetic analyses. There are several characters that distinguish Neocrassa from Codringtonia: distal part of flagellum coiled, long diverticulum of bursa copulatrix, strongly branched mucous glands, missing atrial stimulator, love dart anchor-like in cross-section, and a different course of mating.

== Description ==
Shell large (diameter 34–48 mm, height 19–26 mm), flattened, thick-walled, with open umbilicus. Colour largely brown, shell largely covered by broad, fused horny brown bands interrupeted by paler transverse streaks. Apertural lip white. The foot is yellowish to ochre coloured, with dark spots. The eye stalks are reddish brown.
