= Strepsiportax =

Scientific classification
- Kingdom: Animalia
- Phylum: Chordata
- Class: Mammalia
- Infraclass: Placentalia
- Order: Artiodactyla
- Family: Bovidae
- Subfamily: Bovinae
- Tribe: †Tragoportacini
- Genus: †Strepsiportax; Pilgrim, 1937

Type species
- †Strepsiportax gluten Pilgrim, 1937

Other species
- †Strepsiportax chinjiensis Pilgrim, 1937; †Strepsiportax meyeri Gentry et al., 2026

Extinct genus of mammals

Strepsiportax is an extinct genus of boselaphin bovine.
