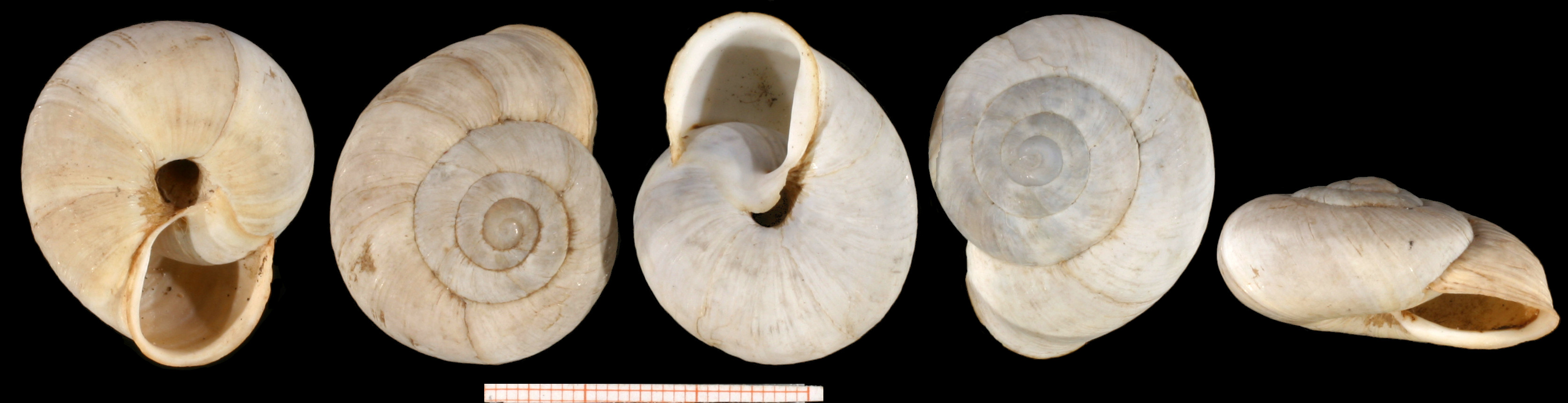

Conservation status
- Vulnerable (IUCN 3.1)

Scientific classification
- Kingdom: Animalia
- Phylum: Mollusca
- Class: Gastropoda
- Order: Stylommatophora
- Family: Helicidae
- Genus: Codringtonia
- Species: C. intusplicata

Binomial name
- Codringtonia intusplicata (Pfeiffer, 1851)

Synonyms
- Codringtonia pantocratoris (Broemme, 1895); Helix intusplicata Pfeiffer, 1851

= Codringtonia intusplicata =

Species of gastropod

Codringtonia intusplicata is a species of air-breathing land snail, a terrestrial pulmonate gastropod mollusc in the family Helicidae, the typical snails.

== Geographic distribution ==
Codringtonia intusplicata is endemic to Greece, where it occurs in the western central part of the country and in the Peloponnese.
