= Rangayyanadurga Four–horned antelope Wildlife Sanctuary =

Wildlife sanctuary in Karnataka

Rangayyanadurga Four-horned antelope Wildlife Sanctuary
- IUCN category IV (habitat/species management area)
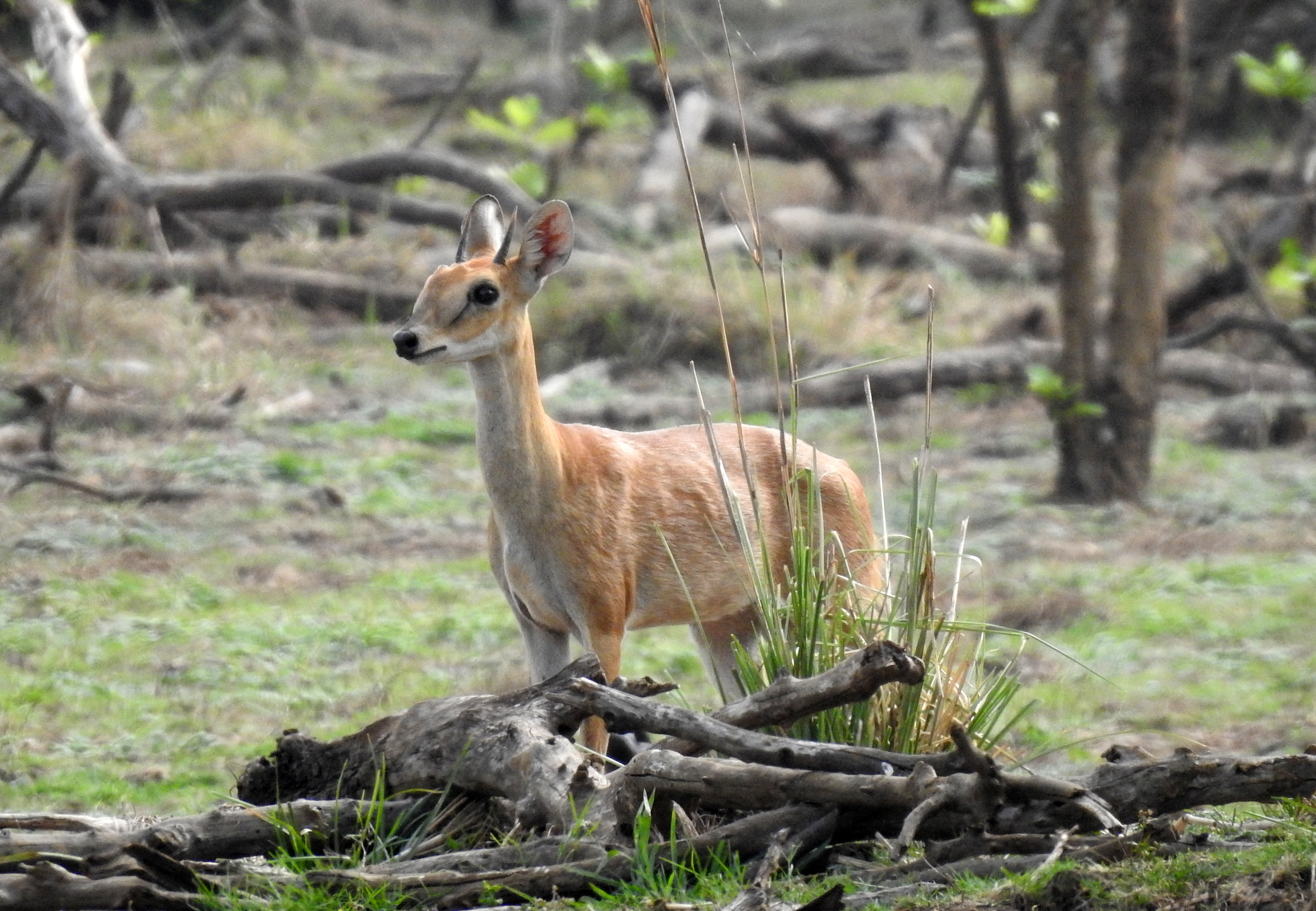
- A four-horned antelope

- Location within Karnataka Location within India
- Interactive map of Rangayyanadurga Four-horned antelope Wildlife Sanctuary
- Location: Karnataka, India
- Coordinates: 14°32′N 76°07′E
- Area: 77.24 km^{2} (29.8 sq mi)
- Established: 2011
- Governing body: Department of forests, Government of Karnataka

Rangayyanadurga Four–horned antelope Wildlife Sanctuary is a wildlife sanctuary in Karnataka India, aimed for the protection of Four-horned antelopes (Tetracerus quadricornis). The four-horned antelope is classified as Vulnerable species by the International Union for the Conservation of Nature and Natural Resources (IUCN). Established in 2011, it is the only four-horned antelope sanctuary in Karnataka.

In 2017, Indian government tagged an area of 0.95 to 4.5 km from the boundary of the sanctuary as an eco-sensitive zone (ESZ). The total area of the eco-sensitive zone is 137.14 km^{2} (53.0 sq mi).

== History ==
As per notification number FEE 240 FWL 2010 Bangalore, dated 10 January 2011, sanctuary was officially established in 2011. It is the first and only four-horned antelope sanctuary in Karnataka.

== Description ==
The sanctuary is located in Jagalur taluk, Davanagere district, Karnataka, India and covers an area of 77.24 km^{2} (29.82 sq mi).

In 2017, to protect from commercial, industrial and other hazardous activities that cause damage to the ecosystem of the sanctuary, the Indian government tagged an area of 0.95 to 4.5 km from the boundary of the sanctuary as an eco-sensitive zone (ESZ). Encompassing thirty villages, the total area of the eco-sensitive zone is 137.14 km^{2} (53.0 sq mi).

== Flora and fauna ==
The four-horned antelope found in the sanctuary is endemic to India, and is classified as Vulnerable species by the International Union for the Conservation of Nature and Natural Resources (IUCN) in its Red List. It is protected under the Schedule 1 of the Wildlife (Protection) Act 1972 (53 of 1972) by Government of India. The Rangayyanadurga Sanctuary is rich in biodiversity. Other than unique antelope species endemic to India, mammals seen here include sloth bear, pangolin, jungle cat, porcupine and hyena. Reptiles seen in the sanctuary include krait, viper and king cobra. It is also home to many butterfly species, bees, birds, bats and spiders. The bird White-naped tit seen here is also classified as vulnerable in IUCN Red List.

== Threats and precautionary measures ==
Poaching, habitat loss and fragmentation are the major threats affecting the sanctuary. In 2012 August, hunters killed a pregnant four-horned antelope. It is said that the number of four-horned antelope, which was only 50 ten years ago, increased to 200 in 2022.
