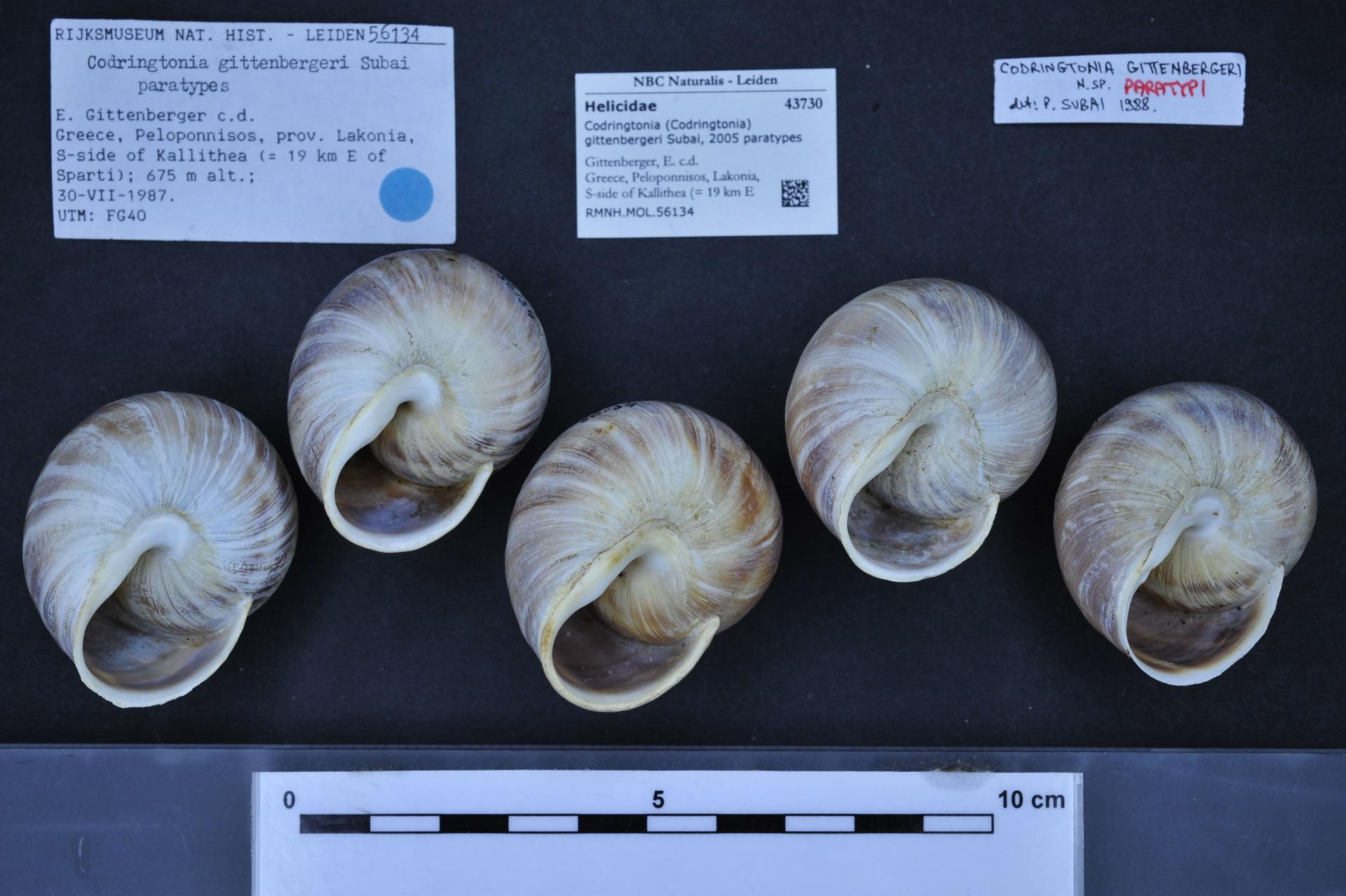
- Codringtonia gittenbergeri shells

Conservation status
- Vulnerable (IUCN 3.1)

Scientific classification
- Kingdom: Animalia
- Phylum: Mollusca
- Class: Gastropoda
- Order: Stylommatophora
- Family: Helicidae
- Genus: Codringtonia
- Species: C. gittenbergeri

Binomial name
- Codringtonia gittenbergeri Subai, 2005

= Codringtonia gittenbergeri =

Species of gastropod

Codringtonia gittenbergeri is a species of air-breathing land snail, a terrestrial pulmonate gastropod mollusc in the family Helicidae, the typical snails.

== Geographic distribution ==
C. gittenbergeri is endemic to Greece, where it occurs in the central part of the country and in southern Peloponnese.
