= Diaphorolepis laevis =

Conservation status
- Data Deficient (IUCN 3.1)

Scientific classification
- Kingdom: Animalia
- Phylum: Chordata
- Class: Reptilia
- Order: Squamata
- Suborder: Serpentes
- Family: Colubridae
- Genus: Diaphorolepis
- Species: D. laevis

Binomial name
- Diaphorolepis laevis Werner, 1923

Species of snake

Diaphorolepis laevis, the Colombian frog-eating snake, is a species of snake in the family Colubridae. The species is native to Colombia.
