= Schizochoerus =

Schizochoerus Temporal range: 13.65–12.75 Ma

Scientific classification
- Kingdom: Animalia
- Phylum: Chordata
- Class: Mammalia
- Infraclass: Placentalia
- Order: Artiodactyla
- Family: Suidae
- Genus: †Schizochoerus; Crusafont-Pairo & Lavocat, 1954

Type species
- S. vallesiensis Crusafont-Pairo & Lavocat, 1954

Species
- †S. anatoliensis; †S. arambourgi; †S. sinapensis; †S. vallesiensis

Extinct genus of ungulates

Schizochoerus was an extinct genus of even-toed ungulates that existed in Asia Minor during the Miocene.
