= Kipsigicerus =

Kipsigicerus Temporal range: Middle Miocene

Scientific classification
- Kingdom: Animalia
- Phylum: Chordata
- Class: Mammalia
- Order: Artiodactyla
- Family: Bovidae
- Subfamily: Bovinae
- Genus: †Kipsigicerus; Thomas, 1984
- Species: †K. labidotus

Binomial name
- †Kipsigicerus labidotus Gentry, 1970

Synonyms
- Protragocerus labidotus

Extinct genus of mammals

Kipsigicerus is an extinct genus of tragoportacin bovid that inhabited East Africa during the Middle Miocene. The type species, Kipsigicerus labidotus, was discovered in Fort Ternan, Kenya, and was originally described as a species of Protragocerus. The horn cores were distinct, being highly compressed with each horn growing forward to one another. Because of the unique horn morphology, the genus Kipsigicerus was erected for this species.

== Palaeoecology ==
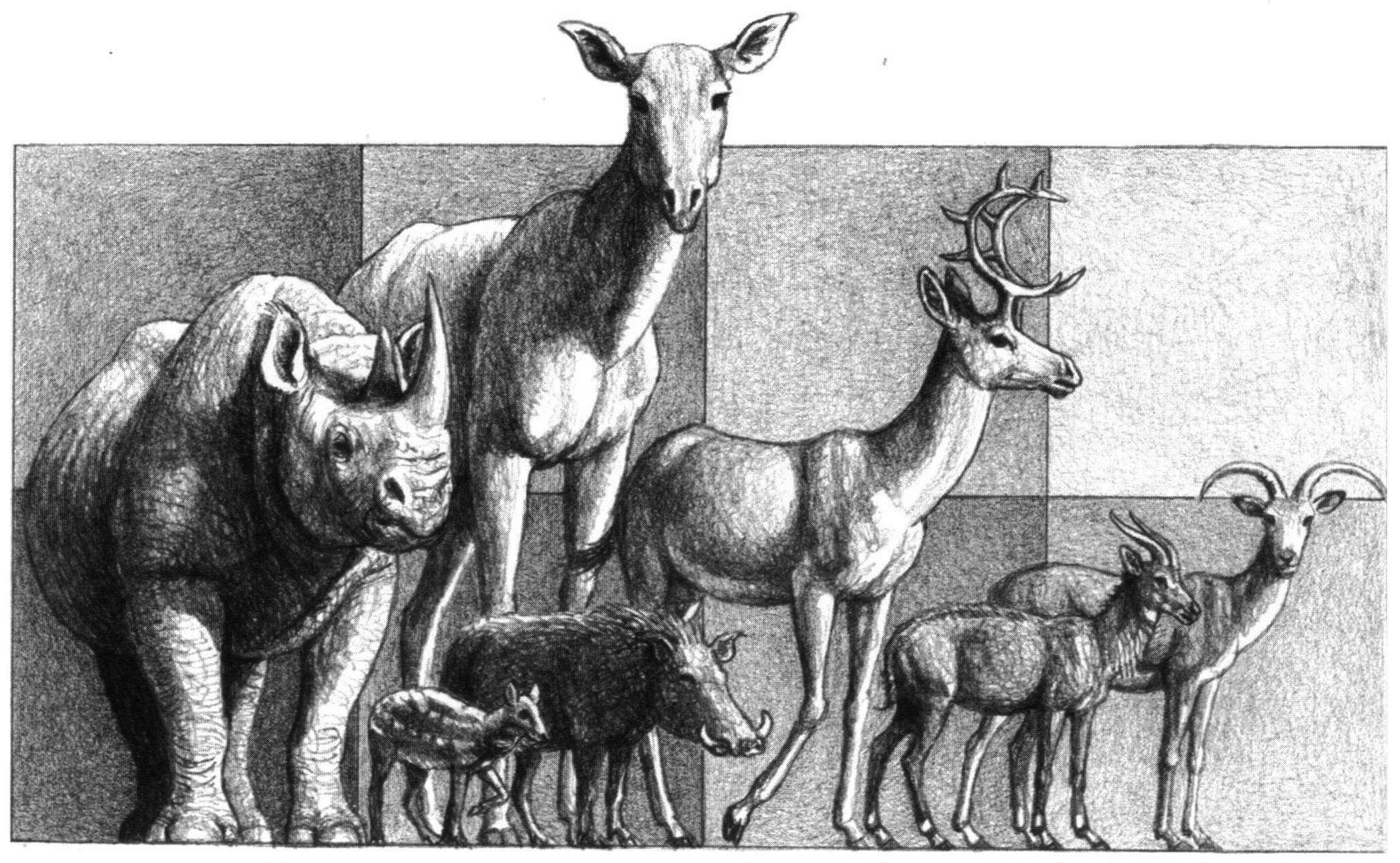
Eastern African mid-Miocene ungulates, including Kipsigicerus (second from right)

Though its palaeoenvironment was forested, the dental microwear patterns of K. labidotus are suggestive of the tragoportacin being a grazing herbivore with some intermediate feeding tendencies. Its premaxillary morphology was geared towards a diet of mixed feeding.
