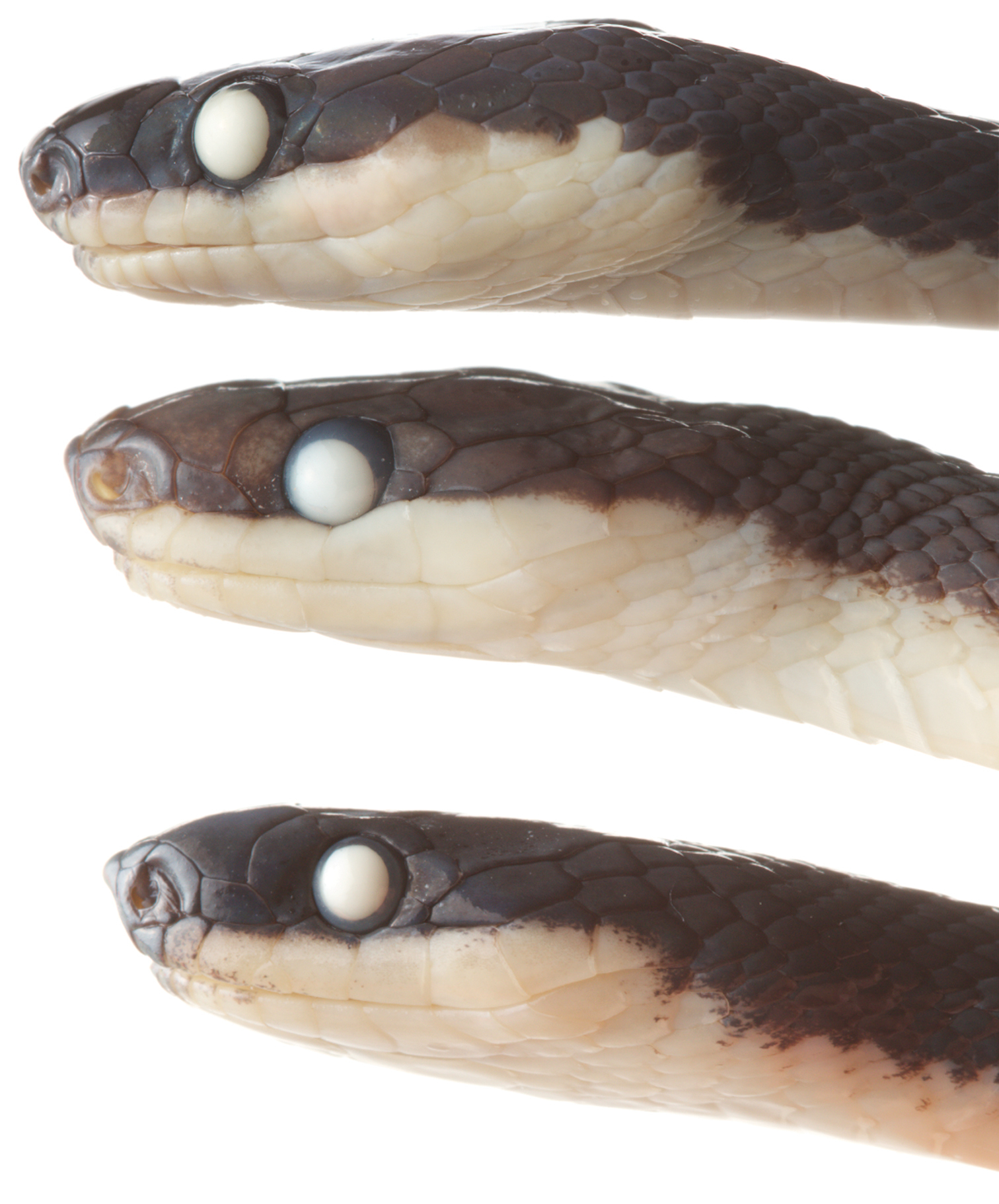
- diaphorolepidine species

Conservation status
- Least Concern (IUCN 3.1)

Scientific classification
- Kingdom: Animalia
- Phylum: Chordata
- Class: Reptilia
- Order: Squamata
- Suborder: Serpentes
- Family: Colubridae
- Genus: Diaphorolepis
- Species: D. wagneri

Binomial name
- Diaphorolepis wagneri Jan, 1863

= Diaphorolepis wagneri =

Species of snake

Diaphorolepis wagneri, the Ecuador frog-eating snake, is a species of snake in the family Colubridae. The species is native to Panama, Ecuador, and Colombia.
