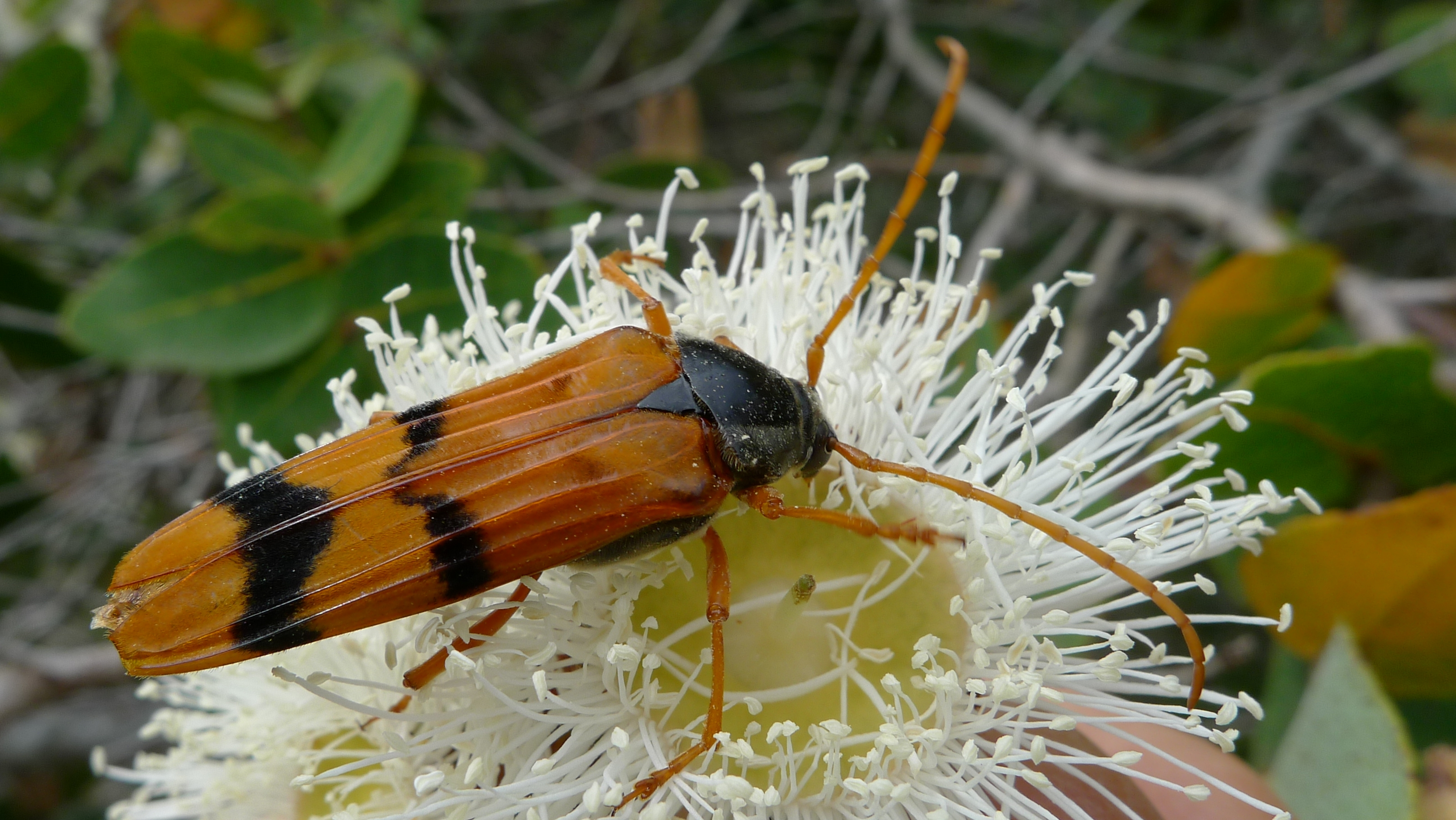
- Tragocerus spencei observed in New South Wales

Scientific classification
- Kingdom: Animalia
- Phylum: Arthropoda
- Clade: Pancrustacea
- Class: Insecta
- Order: Coleoptera
- Suborder: Polyphaga
- Infraorder: Cucujiformia
- Family: Cerambycidae
- Species: Tragocerus

Binomial name
- Tragocerus Latreille, 1829

= Tragocerus =

Genus of beetles

Tragocerus is a genus of longhorn beetle from western regions of Australia.

== Description ==
Members of the genus Tragocerus are diagnosed by having filiform (threadlike) antennae, slightly shorter than the body. Tragocerus species appear to be mimics of wasps, similar to the genera Agapete, Hesthesis, and Macrones, as noted by A. J Nicholson in 1927. The elytra (the hardened forewings characteristic of beetles) are long and rectangular. They are fused along the mid-dorsal line to form a solid unit, though each elytron has indentations just above the hindwing's point of origin, allowing it to move without meaningful disruption. This makes it more difficult to identify them as beetles when in flight. Despite the convincingness of this facade while airborne, the anatomy and sluggish movements upon landing betray the true identity of a Tragocerus beetle.

== Taxonomy ==
Seven species of Tragocerus have been described. Another, T. cylindricus, has since been moved to the related genus Dekeyzeria. A list of valid Tragocerus species is as follows

- Tragocerus fasciatus (Donovan, 1805)
- Tragocerus formosus Pascoe, 1862
- Tragocerus halmaturina Tepper, 1887
- Tragocerus heraldicus Vollenhoven, 1871
- Tragocerus lepidopterus (Schreibers, 1802)
- Tragocerus spencii Hope, 1834
- Tragocerus subfasciatus Germar, 1848
