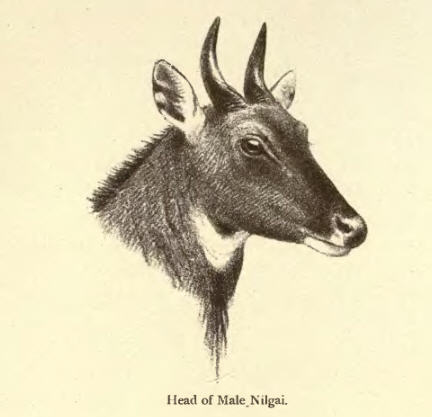
- Nilgai
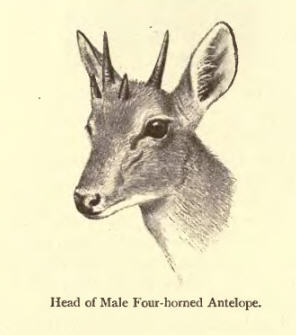
- Four-horned antelope

Scientific classification
- Kingdom: Animalia
- Phylum: Chordata
- Class: Mammalia
- Order: Artiodactyla
- Family: Bovidae
- Subfamily: Bovinae
- Tribe: Boselaphini; Knottnerus-Meyer, 1907

Genera
- Tetracerus; Boselaphus; and see text.

= Boselaphini =

Tribe of mammals

Boselaphini is a tribe of bovines. It contains only two extant genera, each with a single extant species.

== Evolution ==
The Boselaphini or four-horned antelope tribe are the last survivors of a form very similar to that of the ancestors of the broader subfamily. The oldest fossil members of the tribe, such as Eotragus, date to the Miocene about 18 to 20 million years ago. Such fossils possessed horns very similar to those of males belonging to the two living species, although in some cases, they were also present in females. Enamel δ^{13}C values of boselaphins and bovins from the Late Miocene of Pakistan indicates that the former preferred more closed habitats than the latter, which favoured foraging in more open environments.

== Description ==
Both extant species have relatively primitive anatomical and behavioural characteristics and the females have no horns. They are native to the rapidly diminishing forests of India, and tend to avoid open plains. The nilgai has been introduced into southern Texas where a population of a little under 15,000 animals provides some long-term insurance for its survival.

== Genera ==
=== Extant species ===
Image	Genus	Species
	Boselaphus Blainville, 1816	nilgai (Boselaphus tragocamelus)
	Tetracerus Leach, 1825	four-horned antelope (Tetracerus quadricornis)

=== Phylogeny ===
The following are the genera classified under the tribe. Genera marked with † are extinct.

Tribe Boselaphini

- Boselaphus
  - Boselaphus tragocamelus - Nilgai or blue bull (not to be confused with the extinct bluebuck Hippotragus leucophaeus)
- †Carinameryx
- †Elachistoceras
- †Duboisia
- †Eotragus
- †Miotragocerus
- †Neotragocerus
- †Pachyportax
- †Perimia
- †Phronetragus
- †Pliodorcas
- †Plioportax
- †Proboselaphus
- †Punjabameryx
- †Ruticeros
- †Samokeros
- †Selenoportax
- †Sivaceros
- †Sivaportax
- †Sivoreas
- †Strogulognathus
- Tetracerus
  - Tetracerus quadricornis - Four-horned antelope
- †Tragoreas
