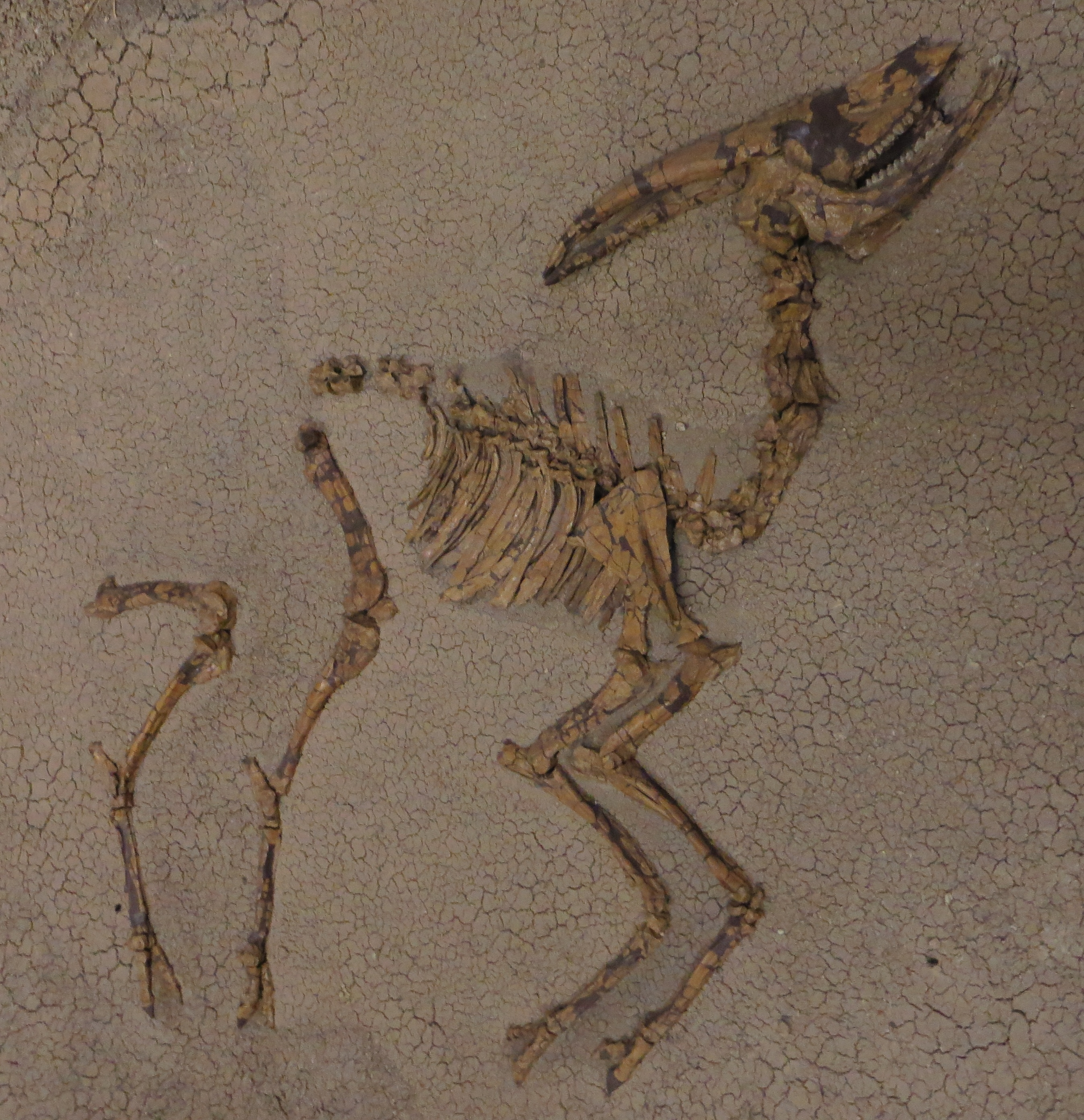

Scientific classification
- Kingdom: Animalia
- Phylum: Chordata
- Class: Mammalia
- Order: Artiodactyla
- Family: Bovidae
- Subfamily: Bovinae
- Tribe: †Tragoportacini
- Genus: †Miotragocerus; Stromer, 1928

Type species
- †Miotragocerus monacensis Stromer, 1928

Other species
- † M. gluten Pilgrim, 1937; † M. pannoniae Kretzoi, 1941; † M. valenciennesi Gaudry, 1861

= Miotragocerus =

Miotragocerus Temporal range: Miocene, 12–8 Ma

Extinct genus of antelope

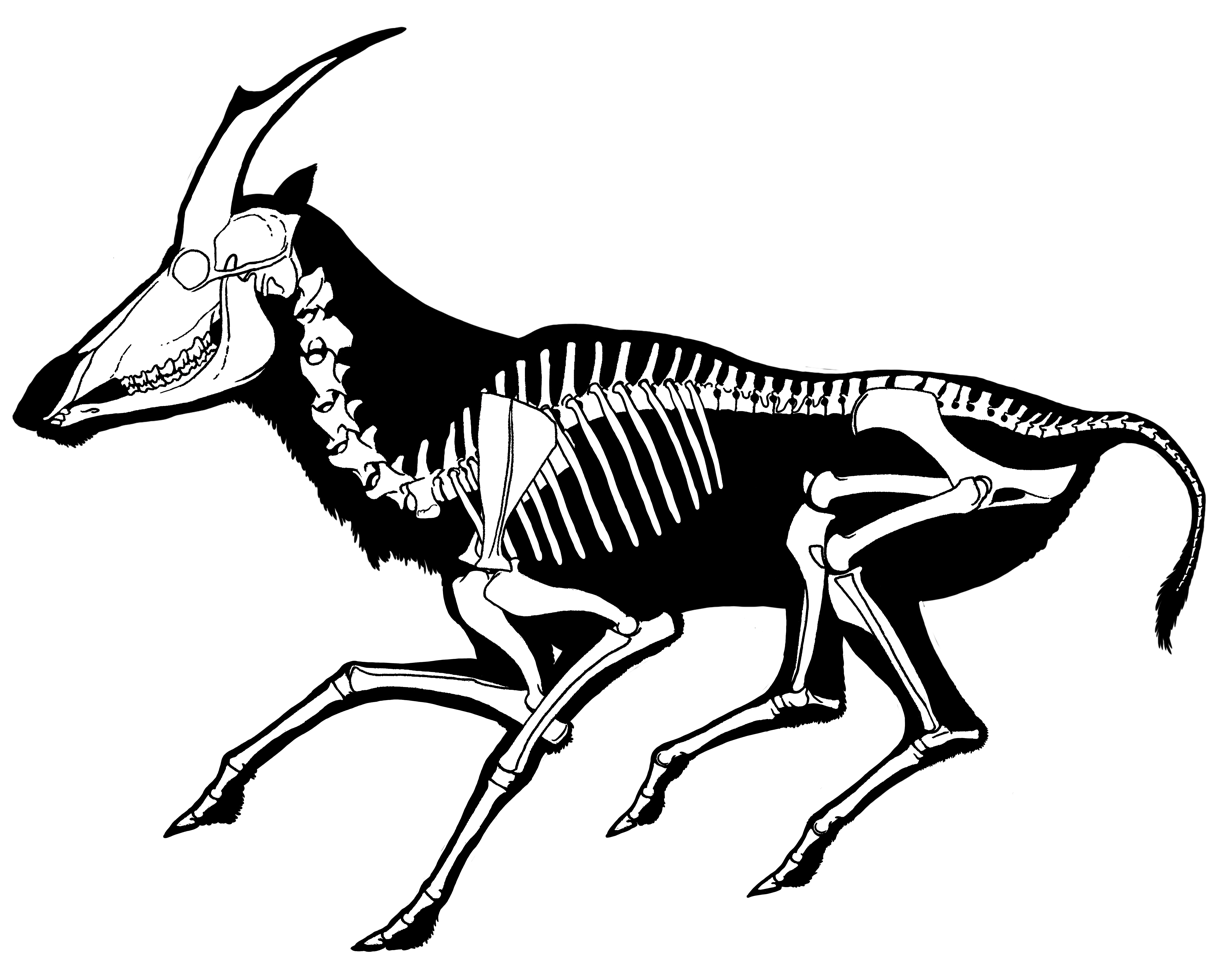
Skeletal reconstruction of Miotragocerus

Miotragocerus is an extinct genus of bovine bovid native to Eurasia during the latter part of the Miocene epoch, from around 13 to 6 million years ago, spanning from Europe to China.

== Taxonomy ==
The placement of Miotragocerus is disputed. Some studies have considered it a member of the living antelope tribe Boselaphini, with others have placed it in the extinct tribe Tragoportacini. A 2021 phylogenetic analysis considered it to be a basal member of the tribe Bovini, and the closest known relative to the possibly extinct saola (Pseudoryx).

== Description ==
M. gluten possessed teeth that were brachydont to sub-hypsodont in their morphology.

== Ecology ==
The dental mesowear of Miotragocerus gluten from Chabbar Syedan in Pakistan evidences that the species was a browsing herbivore that potentially occasionally engaged in mixed feeding. Dental microwear of Miotragocerus gaudryi from the Late Miocene of Bulgaria suggests that it was a folivorous browser. Another dental microwear study examining Miotragocerus sp. from the site of Rudabánya in Hungary also recovers it as a browser.
