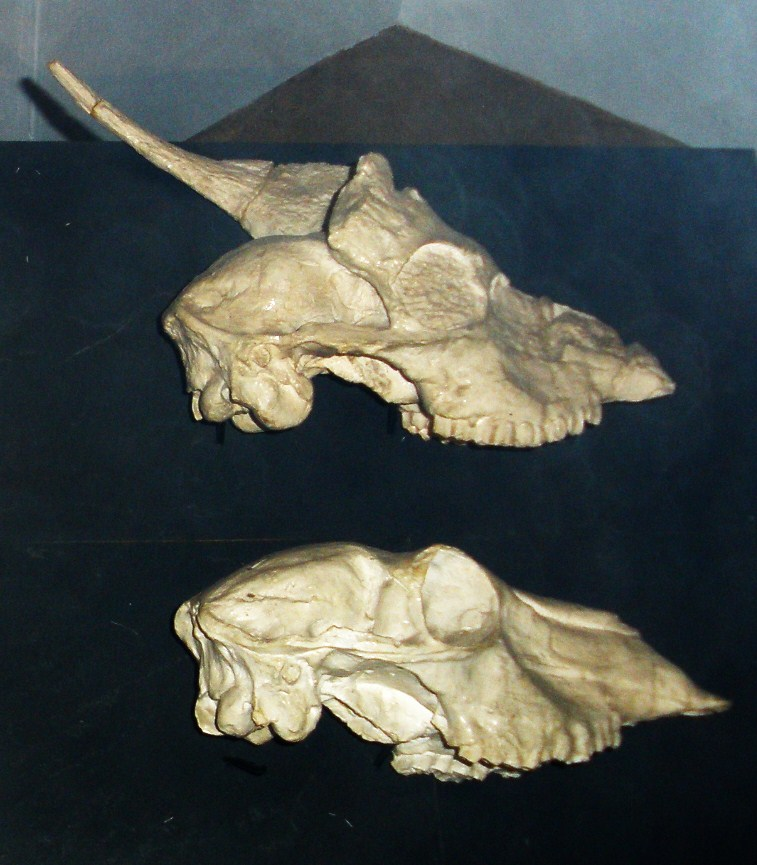
- Fossil of Protragocerus

Scientific classification
- Kingdom: Animalia
- Phylum: Chordata
- Class: Mammalia
- Order: Artiodactyla
- Family: Bovidae
- Subfamily: Bovinae
- Tribe: †Tragoportacini
- Genus: †Protragocerus; Depéret, 1887

Type species
- †Protragocerus chantrei Depéret, 1887

Species
- P. chantrei; P. gluten

= Protragocerus =

Protragocerus Temporal range: Late Miocene 13.650–11.608 Ma

Extinct genus of mammals

Protragocerus is an extinct genus of tragoportacin bovine that inhabited France, India, and Saudi Arabia during the late Serravallian Age (around 13 to 11 million years ago) of the Miocene Epoch. It was named in 1887 by French palaeontologist Charles Depéret in 1887. One former species, Protragocerus labidotus of Kenya, has been reclassified in its own genus, Kipsigicerus.
