= Johannes Roth =

German zoologist (1815–1858)

Johannes Rudolf Roth (September 4, 1815 – June 26, 1858) was a German zoologist and traveler.

== Biography ==
Roth was born in Nuremberg to Karl Johann Friedrich von Roth, president of the Bavarian Supreme Consistory (Oberkonsistorialpräsident). The younger Roth studied medicine and natural sciences, and from 1836 to 1837 accompanied Gotthilf Heinrich von Schubert on his expedition to Egypt and Palestine. Beginning in 1839, he traveled to the East Indies and the northwest coast of Africa. In 1843, he became Professor of Zoology at the Ludwig-Maximilians-Universität München.

He undertook two more journeys to Palestine, starting in 1852 and 1856 respectively. The 1856 expedition was supported by the Prussian government and was intended for research of the structure and formation of the Jordan Rift Valley. He published a book about the topography of the area in Germany. In 1858, while on an expedition in the Anti-Lebanon, Roth came down with a fever and died. He is buried in the Mount Zion Cemetery in Jerusalem.
