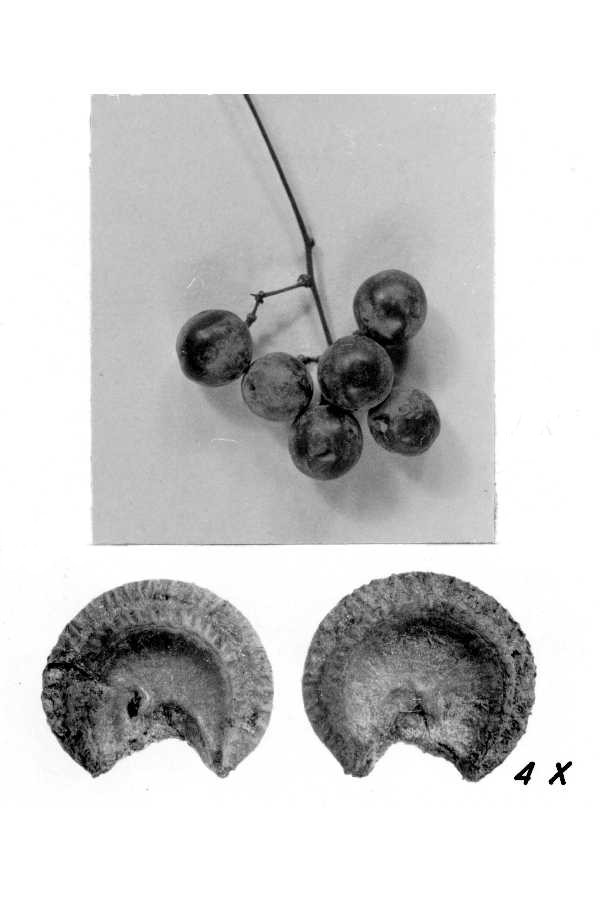
- Fruit and seed of Menispermum canadense

Scientific classification
- Kingdom: Plantae
- Clade: Tracheophytes
- Clade: Angiosperms
- Clade: Eudicots
- Order: Ranunculales
- Family: Menispermaceae
- Subfamily: Menispermoideae
- Genus: Menispermum; L.

Species
- See text

= Menispermum =

Genus of flowering plants

Menispermum (moonseed) is a small genus of deciduous climbing woody vines in the moonseed family (Menispermaceae). Plants in this genus have small dioecious flowers, and clusters of small grape-like drupes. The name, moonseed, comes from the shape of the seed, which resembles a crescent moon. The word Menispermum is derived from the Greek words μήν (mēn), meaning (crescent) moon, and σπέρμα (sperma) meaning seed. The common name moonseed is also applied to some other species in the related genus Cocculus.

== Species ==
There are only two recognised species in the genus Menispermum these being :

- Menispermum canadense L. – Canadian moonseed, Ghost grape (northeastern North America)
- Menispermum dauricum DC. – Asian or Daurian moonseed, named for the homeland of the Daur, a Mongolic people inhabiting the part of Northeast Asia to which the plant is native. Common name in Chinese : 蝙蝠葛 ( bian fu ge ).

=== Formerly placed here ===
- Anamirta cocculus (L.) Wight & Arn. (as M. cocculus L.)
- Calycocarpum lyonii (Pursh) A.Gray (as M. lyonii Pursh)
- Cocculus carolinus (L.) DC. (as M. carolinum L.)
- Cocculus hirsutus (L.) Diels (as M. hirsutum L.)
- Cocculus orbiculatus (L.) DC. (as M. trilobum Thunb.)
- Jateorhiza palmata (Lam.) Miers (as M. columba Roxb. or M. palmatum Lam.)
- Pericampylus glaucus (Lam.) Merr. (as M. glaucum Lam.)
- Sinomenium acutum (Thunb.) Rehder & E.H.Wilson (as M. acutum Thunb.)
- Tinospora cordifolia (Willd.) Hook.f. & Thomson (as M. cordifolium Willd.)
- Tinospora crispa (L.) Hook. f. & Thomson (as M. crispum L.)

== Toxicity ==
All parts of these plants are known to be poisonous, containing dauricine and related isoquinoline alkaloids, and children have died from eating the fruits. Dauricine inhibits cardiac K+ channels thus causing arrhythmia. Other symptoms caused by consumption of the grape-like fruits include excitation of the CNS, leading to seizures and neuromuscular arrest. First aid in cases of Menispermum poisoning involves the induction of vomiting, followed by the administration of medicinal charcoal and sodium sulphate. Clinical therapy : gastric lavage ( possibly with 0.1% potassium permanganate ) instillation of medicinal charcoal and sodium sulphate; electrolyte substitution, control of acidosis with sodium bicarbonate ( pH of urine 7.5 ). In case of spasms, intravenous administration of diazepam. Provision of intubation and oxygen respiration in case of respiratory arrest or paralysis. Checking of diuresis and kidney function.

== Medicinal Use ==
Menispermum dauricum has been used to treat skin disorders, rheumatism, and cervical cancer.

Menispermum canadense has been used in herbal medicine as a tonic, laxative, dermatological aid, venereal aid, and diuretic. Yellow Medicine County in Minnesota is named after one of this plant's common names.

Plants of this species are sometimes grown as ornamentals in gardens. Gardeners can propagate this plant from the division of runners or by seed.

== Gallery ==
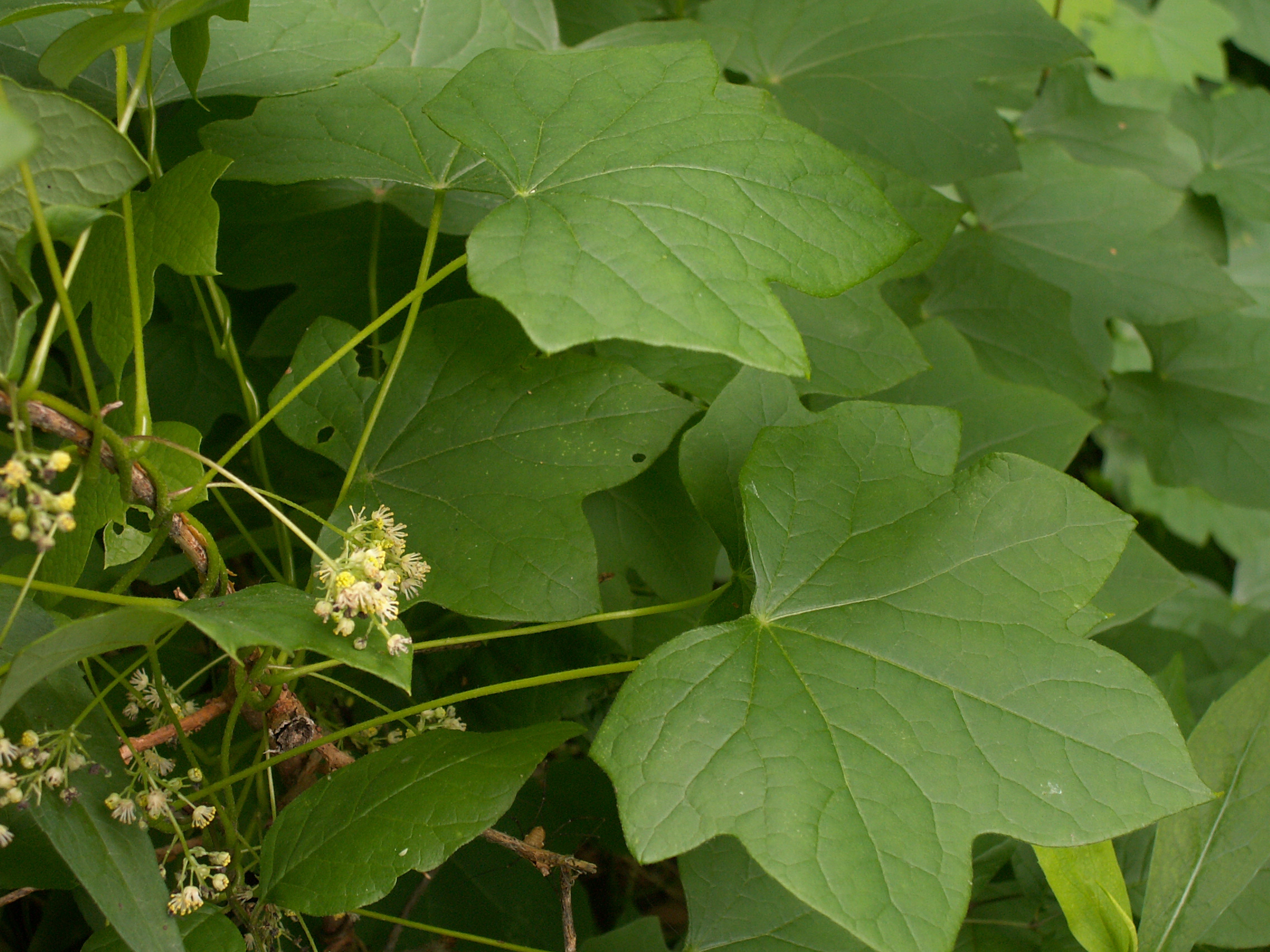
Menispermum canadense in flower, Frick Park, Pittsburgh

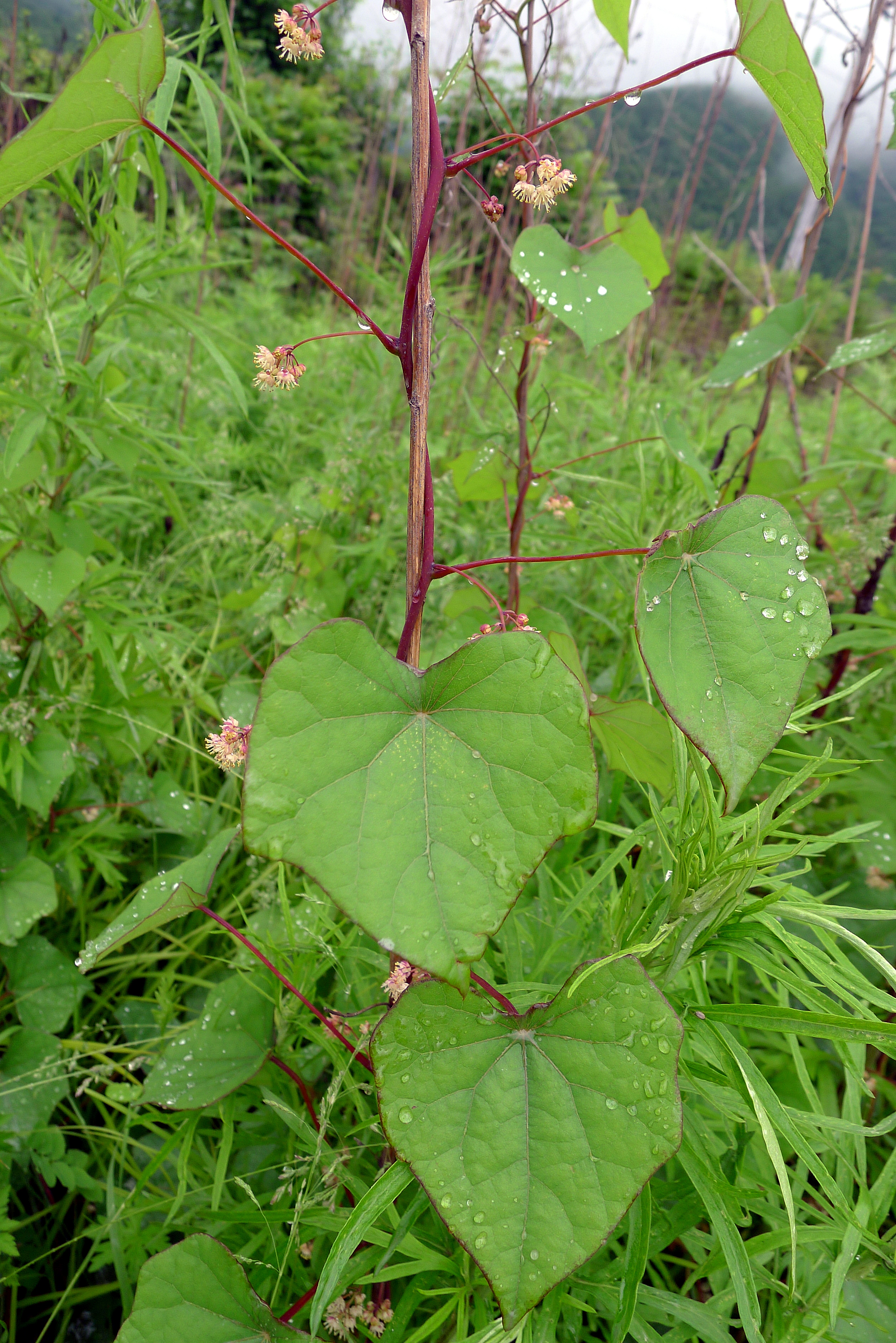
Menispermum dauricum in flower, Primorsky Krai, Russian Far East

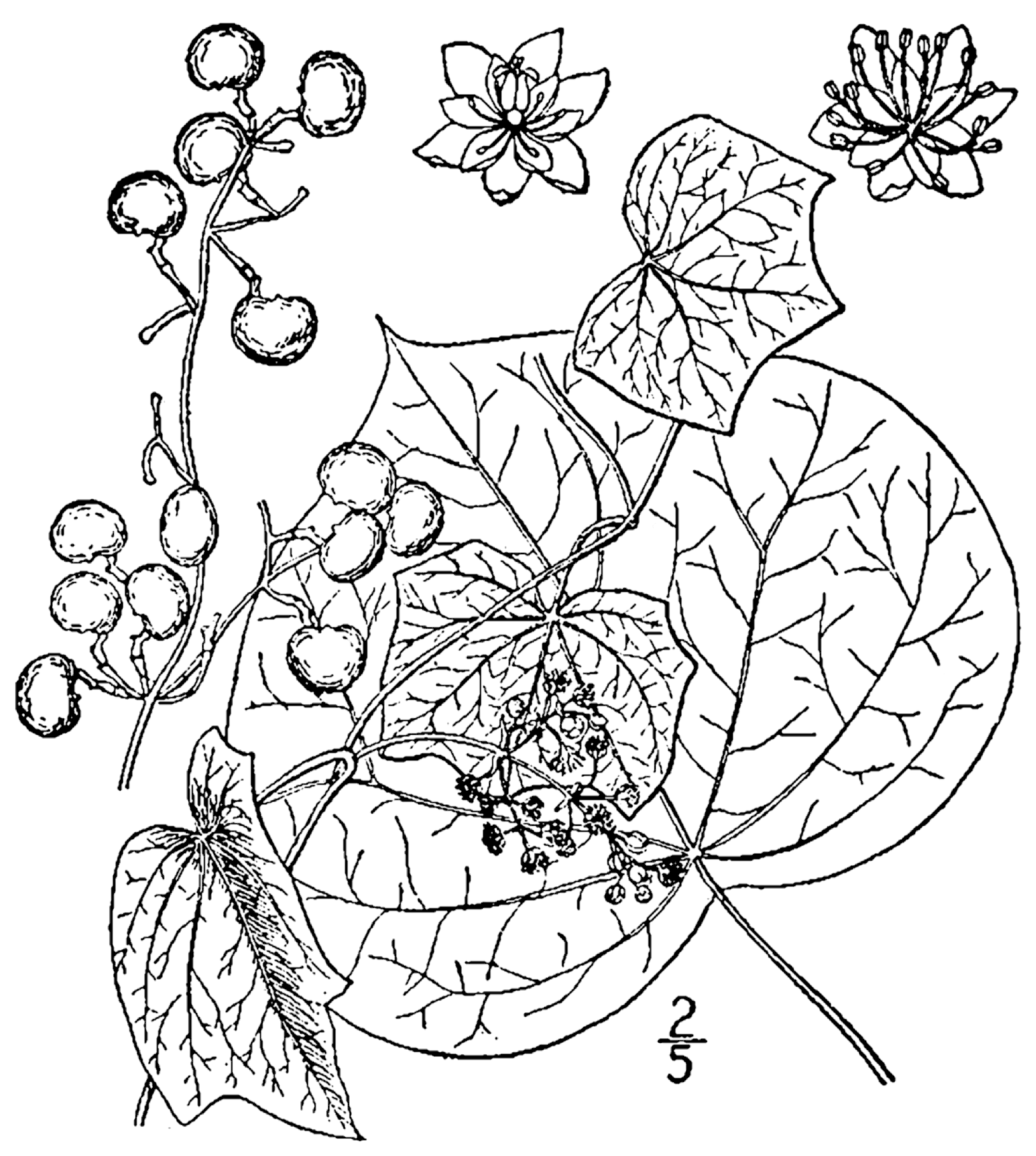
Menispermum canadense from Britton & Brown 1913
