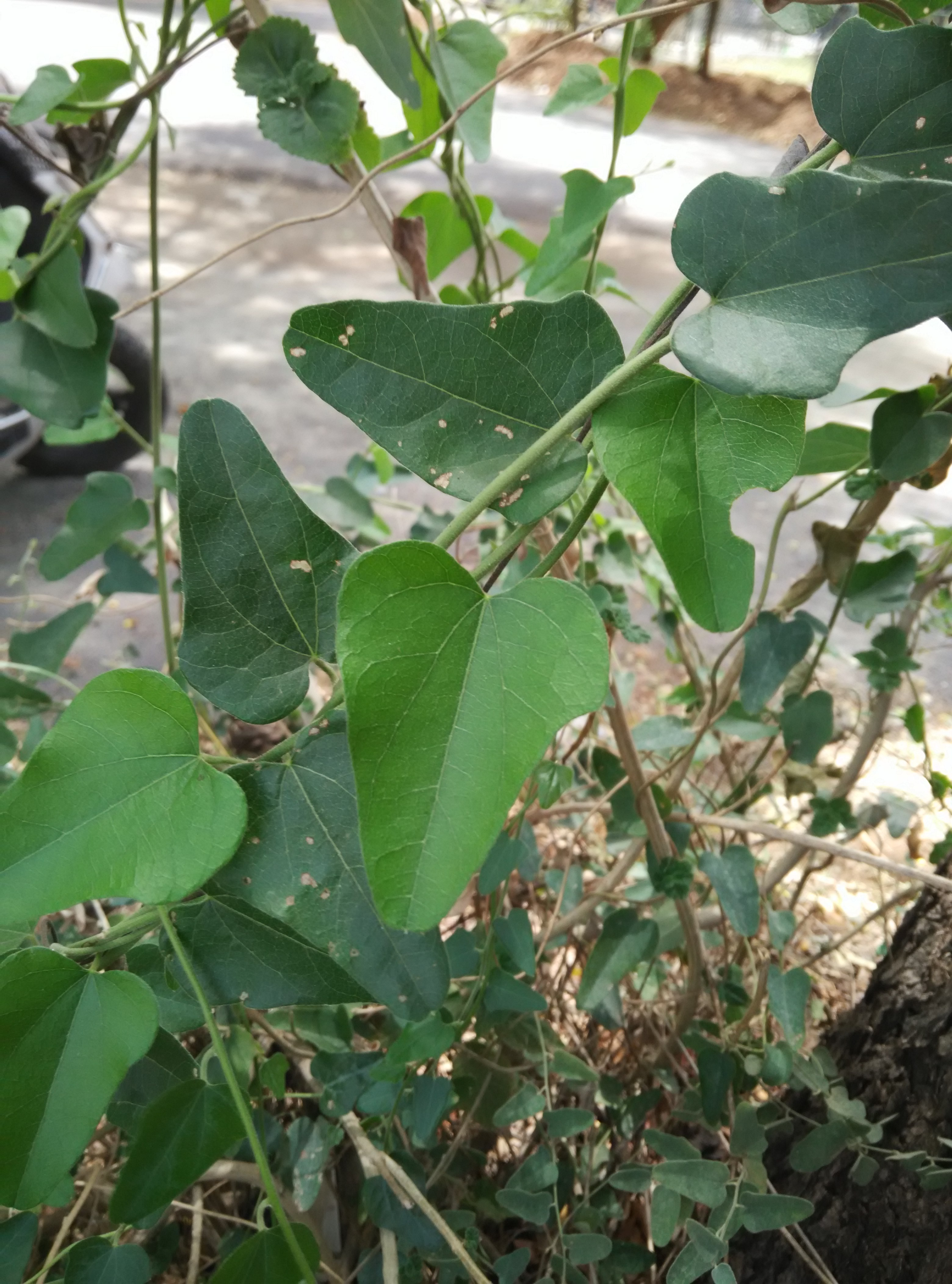
- Cocculus hirsutus

Scientific classification
- Kingdom: Plantae
- Clade: Tracheophytes
- Clade: Angiosperms
- Clade: Eudicots
- Order: Ranunculales
- Family: Menispermaceae
- Genus: Cocculus; DC. (1817)

Type species
- Cocculus villosus DC. (1817)

Species
- 4; see text

Synonyms
- Holopeira Miers (1851)

= Cocculus =

Genus of flowering plants

Cocculus /ˈkɒkjuːləs/ is a genus of four species of woody vines and shrubs, native to tropical and subtropical regions of Africa and Asia.

== Species ==
Four species are accepted:

- Cocculus hirsutus (L.) Diels – tropical Africa east to India and Nepal
- Cocculus madagascariensis Diels – Madagascar
- Cocculus prainianus (Diels) A.Pramanik & Thoth. – Nagaland and Nicobar Islands
- Cocculus taiwanianus S.S.Ying – Taiwan

=== Formerly placed here ===
- Jateorhiza palmata (Lam.) Miers (as C. palmatus (Lam.) DC.)
- Nephroia carolina (L.) L.Lian & Wei Wang (as C. carolinus (L.) DC.)
- Nephroia diversifolia (DC.) L.Lian & Wei Wang (as C. diversifolius DC.)
- Nephroia orbiculata (L.) L.Lian & Wei Wang (as C. orbiculatus (L.) DC. and C. sarmentosus (Lour.) Diels)
- Pachygone laurifolia (DC.) L.Lian & Wei Wang (as C. laurifolius DC.)
- Pericampylus glaucus (Lam.) Merr. (as C. incanus Colebr.)
- Sinomenium acutum (Thunb.) Rehder & E.H.Wilson (as C. acutus (Thunb.) Makino, C. diversifolius Miq., and C. heterophyllus Hemsl. & E.H.Wilson)
- Tinospora cordifolia (Willd.) Hook.f. & Thomson (as C. cordifolius (Willd.) DC.)
