= Boselaphus namadicus =

Boselaphus namadicus Temporal range: 3.4–0.6 Ma Late Pliocene-Mid Pleistocene

Scientific classification
- Domain: Eukaryota
- Kingdom: Animalia
- Phylum: Chordata
- Class: Mammalia
- Order: Artiodactyla
- Family: Bovidae
- Subfamily: Bovinae
- Genus: Boselaphus
- Species: †B. namadicus

Binomial name
- †Boselaphus namadicus (Rutimeyer, 1878)

Synonyms
- Portax namadicus

Extinct species of bovid

Boselaphus namadicus is an extinct species of bovid that lived in South Asia (India and Pakistan) from the Late Pliocene to the Mid Pleistocene.

== Taxonomy ==
Boselaphus namadicus was first discovered in 1878, and was originally described as Portax namadicus. It was moved to Boselaphus less than a year later when similarities were found between it and the living nilgai.

== Description ==
This species was larger than the modern nilgai. Its horn cores are slightly closer to the orbits compared to its living relative, with their inner keel further inward and more to the front. Their teeth are hypsodont, indicating that it was a grazer.

Fossils of B. namadicus are known from the Siwaliks and are found in association with other large herbivores such as Equus sivalensis, Stegodon, rhinoceroses, and the straight-tusked elephant. The presence of B. namadicus and these other large herbivores indicate that the environment of the area at the time was dominated by open grassland.
