= C6H12O5 =

The molecular formula C_{6}H_{12}O_{5} (molar mass : 164.16 g/mol, exact mass : 164.068473) may refer to:

- 1,5-Anhydroglucitol
- 2-Deoxy-D-glucose
- 5-Deoxyinositol
- Fucose
- Fuculose
- Rhamnose
- Sorbitan
