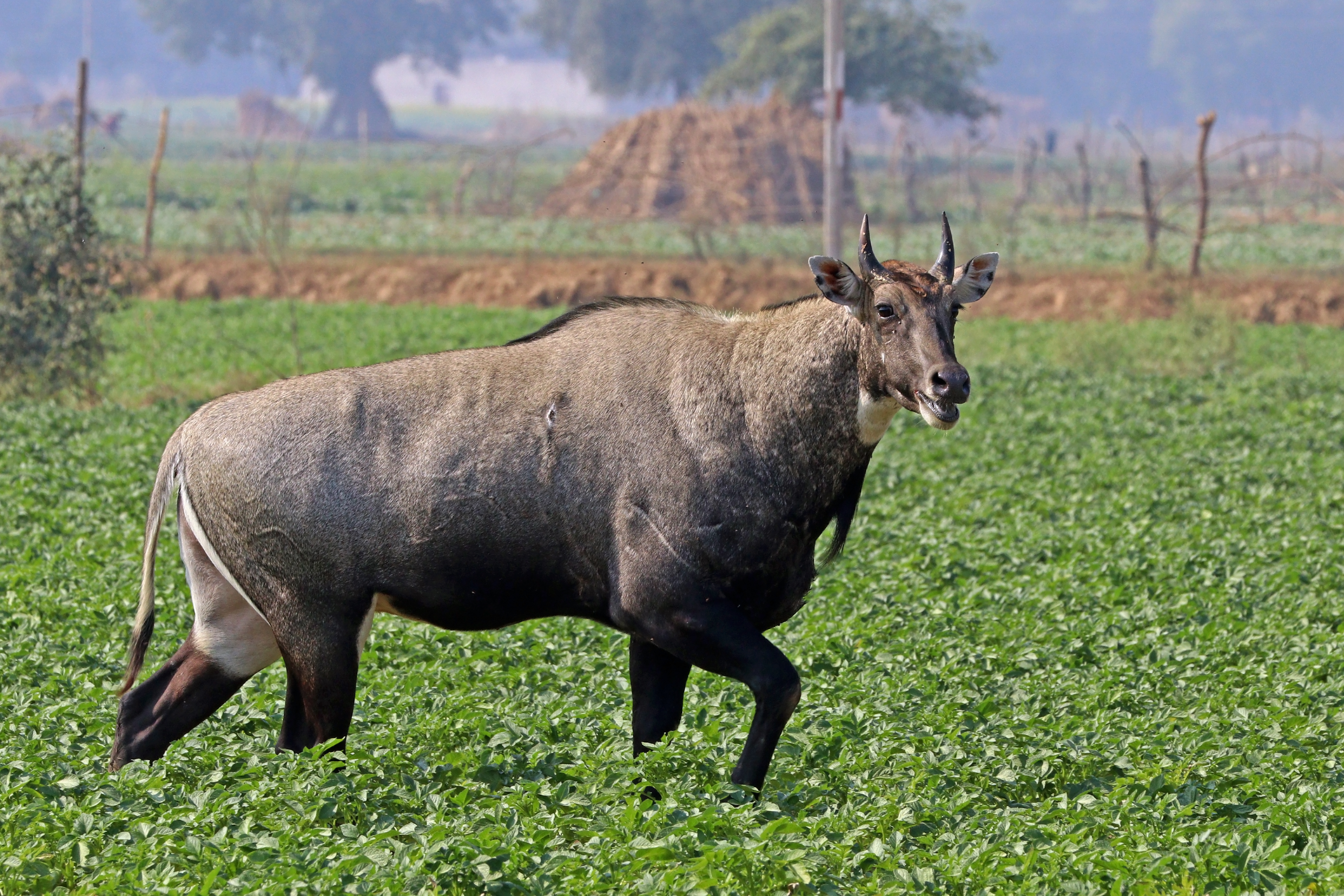
- Male at Jamtra, Madhya Pradesh
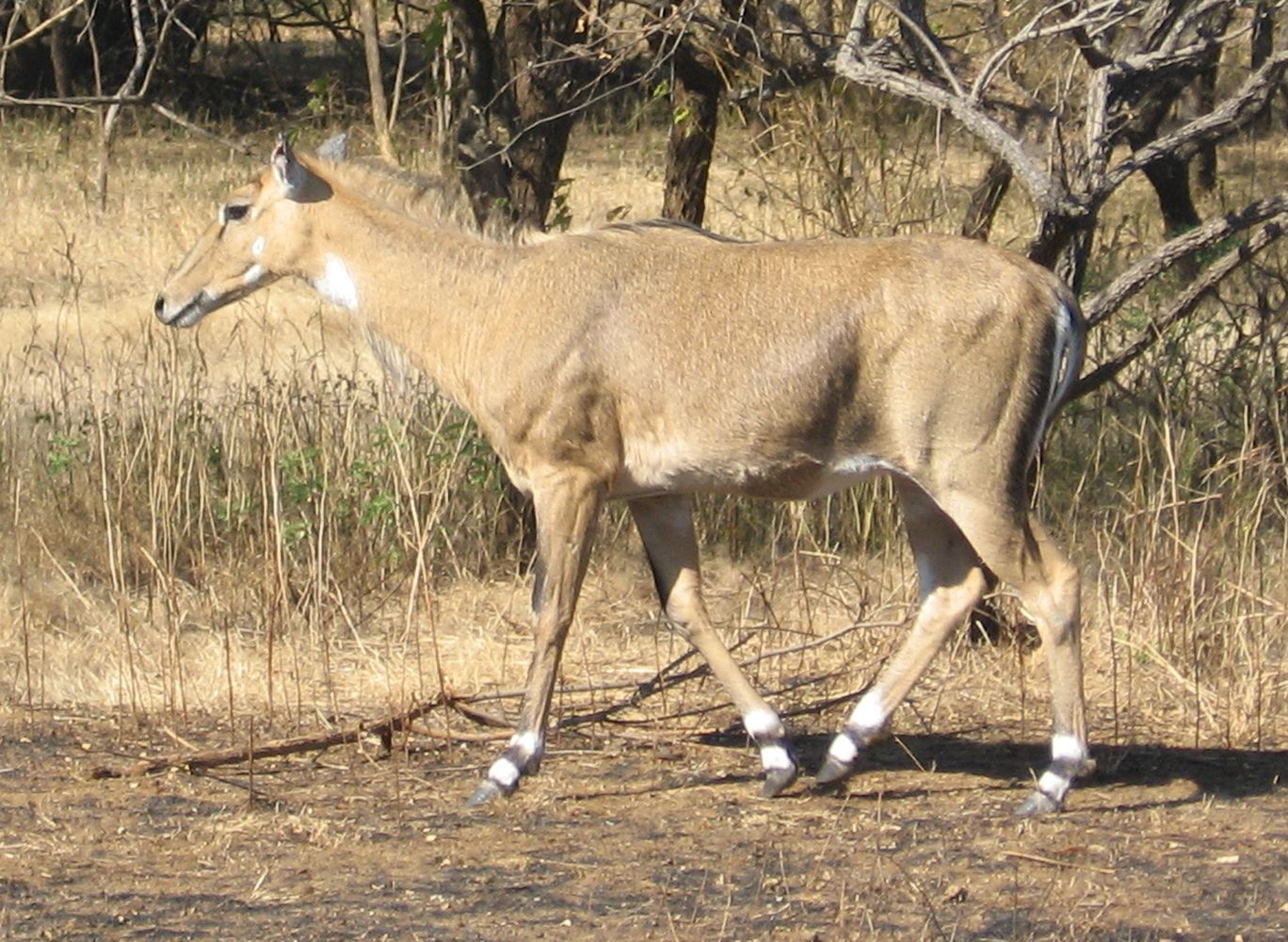
- Female at Gir National Park, Gujarat

Conservation status
- Least Concern (IUCN 3.1)
- CITES Appendix III

Scientific classification
- Kingdom: Animalia
- Phylum: Chordata
- Class: Mammalia
- Order: Artiodactyla
- Family: Bovidae
- Subfamily: Bovinae
- Genus: Boselaphus
- Species: B. tragocamelus

Binomial name
- Boselaphus tragocamelus (Pallas, 1766)
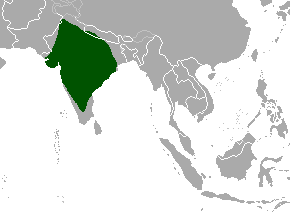
- Natural range of the nilgai

Synonyms
- Antilope tragocamelus (Pallas, 1766); A. albipes (Erxleben, 1777); A. leucopus (Zimmermann, 1777); A. picta (Pallas, 1776); Boselaphus picta (de Blainville, 1816); B. albipes (Desmarest, 1816); Cemas tragocamelus (Oken, 1816); C. picta (Oken, 1816); Damalis risia (C. H. Smith, 1827); D. picta (Brookes, 1828); Portax risia (C. H. Smith, 1827); P. tragelaphus (Sundevall, 1846); Tragelaphus hippelaphus (Ogilby, 1838)

= Nilgai =

Largest living Asian antelope

The nilgai (Boselaphus tragocamelus) (/ˈnilˌɡaɪ/, literally meaning "blue cow") is the largest antelope in Asia. It is ubiquitous across the northern Indian subcontinent. It is the sole living member of the genus Boselaphus, which was first scientifically described by Peter Simon Pallas in 1766. It is a sturdy, thin-legged antelope with a sloping back, a deep neck with a white patch on the throat, a short crest of hair along the neck terminating in a tuft, and white facial spots. A column of pendant, coarse hair hangs from the dewlap ridge below the white patch. It stands 100–150 cm (39–59 in) at the shoulder; males weigh 109–288 kg (240–635 lb), and the lighter females 100–213 kg (220–470 lb). Sexual dimorphism is prominent; while females and juveniles are orange to tawny, adult males have a bluish-grey coat. Only males have horns, which are 15–24 cm (5.9–9.4 in) long.

Major nilgai populations occur in the Indian and Nepal Terai. The diurnal nilgai prefers areas with short bushes and scattered trees in scrub forests and grassy plains. It commonly occurs on agricultural land and rarely in dense forests. Its diet encompasses grasses and herbs, though it also eats woody plants in the dry tropical forests of India. Females become sexually mature by two years, while males do not become sexually active until four or five years old. The time of the year when mating takes place varies geographically, but a peak breeding season lasting three to four months can be observed at most places. Gestation lasts eight to nine months, following which a single calf is born, sometimes also twins or even triplets. Nilgai calves stay hidden for the first few weeks of their lives. Three distinct kinds of groups have been observed: one or two females with young calves, three to six adult and yearling females with calves, and all-male groups with two to 18 members. The lifespan of the nilgai is around 10 years. Typically tame, the nilgai may appear timid and cautious if harassed or alarmed; it flees up to 300 m (980 ft), or even 700 m (2,300 ft), galloping away from the source of danger.

The nilgai is categorised as least concern on the IUCN Red List. Feral nilgai are an invasive species in Texas, USA, where it was introduced in 1924.

== Taxonomy ==
The nilgai was described by Peter Simon Pallas, who in 1766 proposed the scientific name Antilope tragocamelus. Pallas based his description on an account of a male nilgai by James Parsons.

== Etymology ==
The vernacular name "nilgai" /ˈnɪlˌɡaɪ/ comes from the fusion of the Hindi words nil (blue) and gai (cow). The word was first recorded in use in 1882. Alternative origins could be from the Persian gaw ("cow"). The nilgai has been referred to by a variety of names—neelghae, nilgau, nilgo, nylghau, and nylghai, constructions referring to other "blue" animals. During Mughal emperor Aurangzeb's reign of India, the nilgai was known by the name nilghor (nil for "blue" and ghor for "horse").

The generic name Boselaphus comes from the combination of the Latin bos (cow or ox) and the Greek elaphos (deer). The specific name tragocamelus is derived from the joining of the two Greek words tragos (he-goat) and kamelos (camel). The binomial combination was first used by English zoologist Philip Sclater in 1883.

== Evolution ==
A 1992 phylogenetic study of mitochondrial DNA sequences showed a strong possibility of a clade consisting of Boselaphini, Bovini, and Tragelaphini. Bovini consists of the genera Bubalus, Bos, Pseudoryx (saola), Syncerus (African buffalo), Bison, and the extinct Pelorovis. Tragelaphini consists of two genera: Taurotragus (eland) and Tragelaphus. A closer relationship between Boselaphini and Tragelaphini was predicted, and seconded by a similar study in 1999.

- - Bovini
  - - Tragelaphini
    - Boselaphini

Though the tribe Boselaphini has no African representation today, fossil evidence supports its presence in the continent in the prehistoric times, as early as the late Miocene. The two living antelope species of this tribe have been found to have a closer relationship with the earliest bovids (like Eotragus species) than do the other bovids. This tribe originated at least 8.9 million years ago, in much the same area where the four-horned antelope lives today, and may represent the most "primitive" of all living bovids, having changed the least since the origins of the family. The extant and extinct boselaphine forms show similar development of the horn cores (the central bony part of the horn). Though the extant nilgai females lack horns, historic relatives of the antelope had horned females. Fossil relatives were once placed in the subfamily Cephalophinae which now contains only the African duikers. Fossils of Protragoceros and Sivoreas dating back to the late Miocene have been discovered not only in Asia and southern Europe but also in the Ngorora Formation (Kenya) and are thought to belong to the Boselaphini. Other Miocene fossils of boselaphines discovered are of Eotragus, Miotragocerus and Tragoportax; fossils of Miotragoceros are not apparent in Africa (only M. cyrenaicus has been reported from the continent), but have significant presence in the Shiwalik Hills in India and Pakistan, as do several Tragoportax species. A 2005 study showed the migration of Miotragoceros to eastern Asia around eight million years ago. Alan W. Gentry of the Natural History Museum reported the presence of another boselaphine, Mesembriportax, from Langebaanweg (South Africa).

Remains of the nilgai dating back to the Pleistocene have been discovered from the Kurnool caves in southern India. Evidence suggests that they were hunted by humans during the Mesolithic period (5,000 to 8,000 years ago).

== Description ==
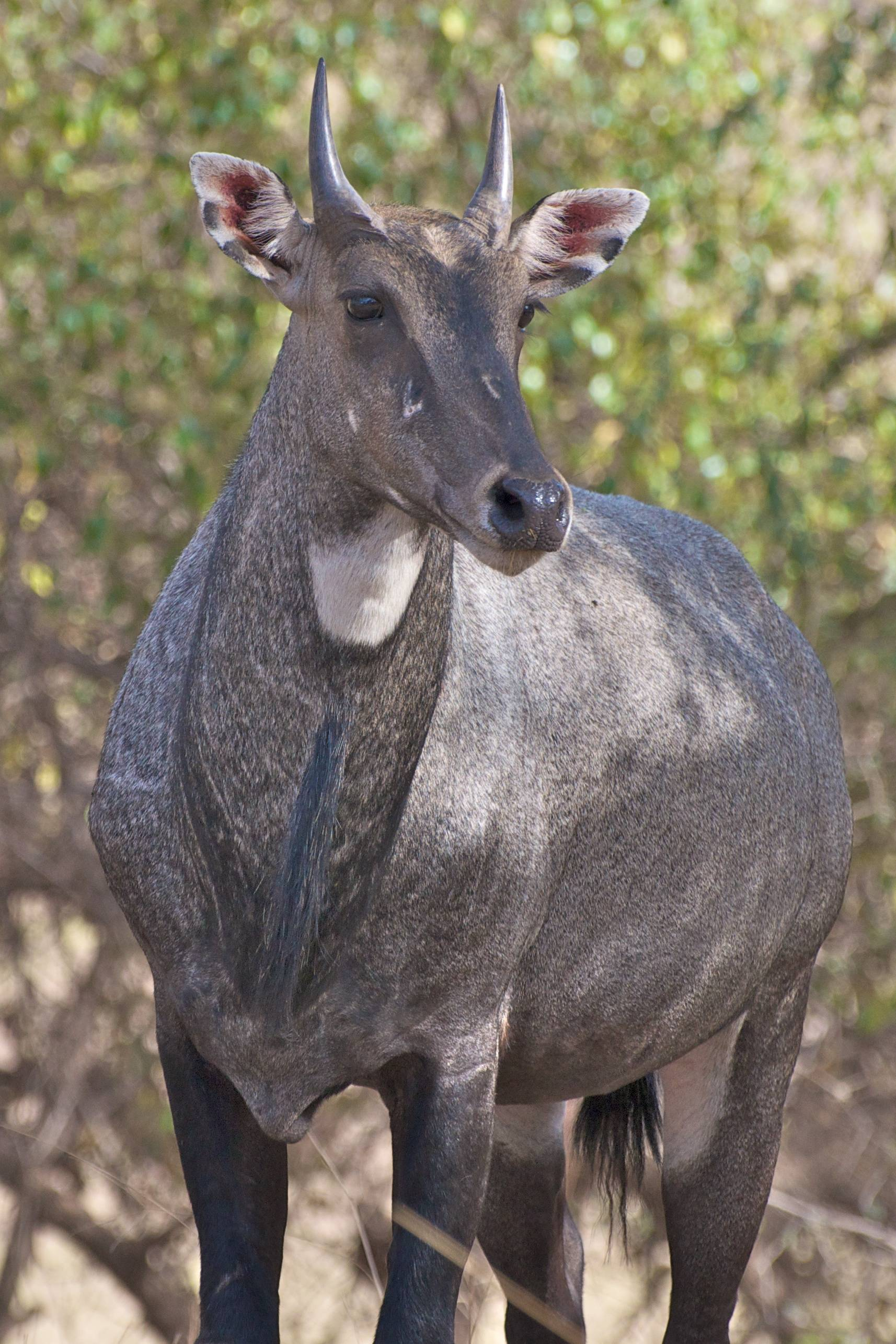
Close view of a male nilgai showing the facial markings, throat patch, beard, and short horns

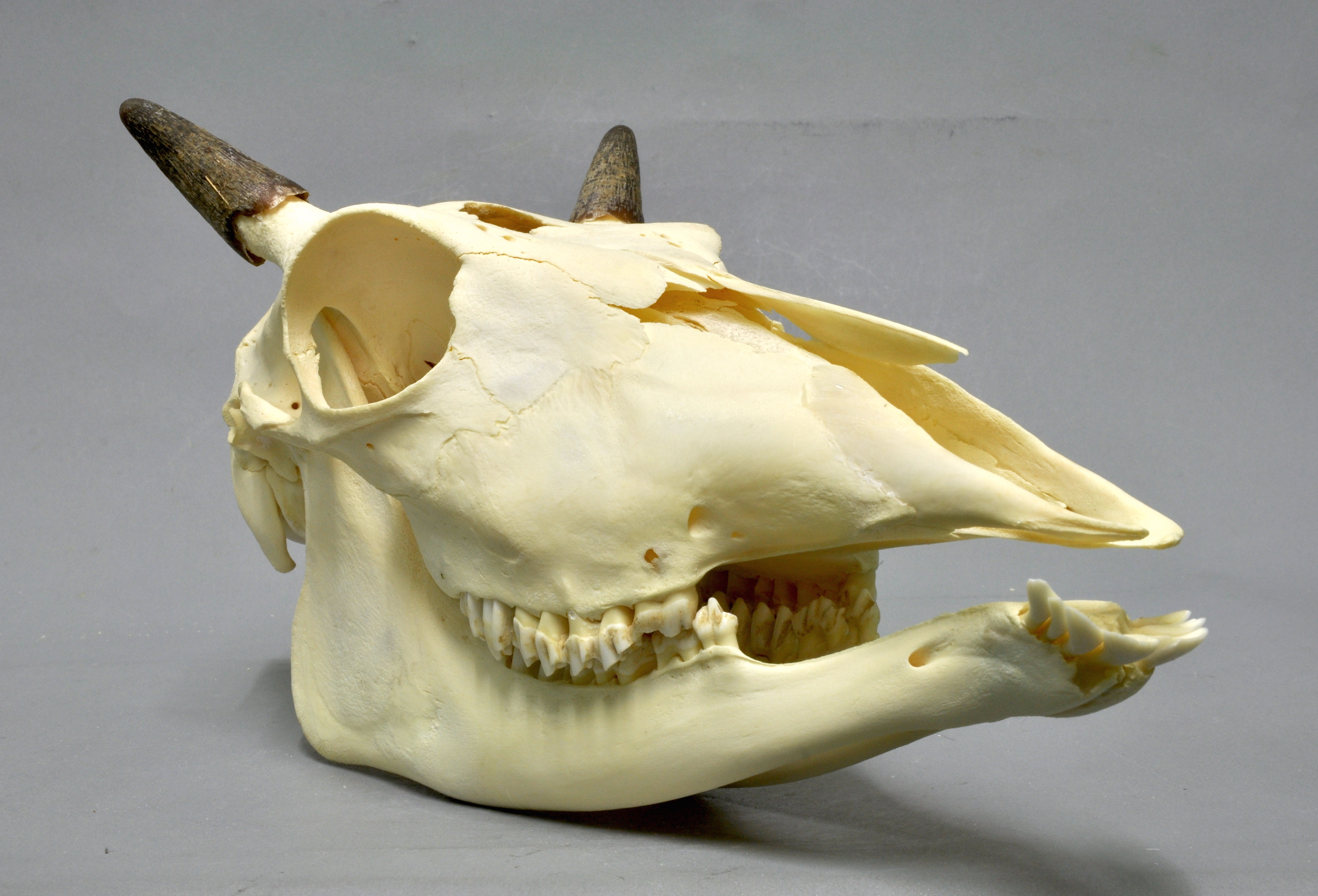
Skull of a nilgai

The nilgai is sturdy with a deep neck, a sloping back and thin legs; it has a short mane of hair behind and along the back ending behind the shoulder, a white patch on the throat, and around two white spots each on its face, ears, cheeks, lips, and chin. The ears, tipped with black, are 15–18 cm (5.9–7.1 in) long. Along the dewlap ridge below the white throat patch, it has a column of coarse hair, known as the "pendant" which is around 13 cm (5.1 in) long in males. The tufted tail has a few white spots and is tipped with black. It is up to 54 centimetres (21 in) long; the forelegs are generally longer than the hindlegs, and are often marked with white "socks". While females and juveniles are orange to tawny, males are much darker and typically bluish grey. The ventral parts, the insides of the thighs, and the tail are all white. A white stripe extends from the underbelly and broadens as it approaches the rump, forming a patch lined with dark hair. Almost white, though not albino, individuals have been observed in the Sariska National Park. while individuals with white patches have been recorded at zoos. The hairs, typically 23–28 centimetres (9.1–11.0 in) long, are fragile and brittle. Males have thicker skin on their head and neck that protect them in fights. The nilgai is not well-insulated with subcutaneous fat during winter, so severe cold might be fatal for the nilgai. Males are horned, and the occasional female. The horns are 15–24 centimetres (5.9–9.4 in) long but generally shorter than 30 cm (12 in). Smooth and straight, these may point backward or forward. The horns of the nilgai lack the ringed structure typical of those of other bovids.

The nilgai is the largest antelope in Asia. It stands 1.0–1.5 m (3 ft 3 in – 4 ft 11 in) at the shoulder; the head-and-body length is typically 1.7–2.1 m (5 ft 7 in – 6 ft 11 in). Males weigh 109–288 kg (240–635 lb); the maximum weight recorded is 308 kg (679 lb). Females are lighter, weighing 100–213 kg (220–470 lb). Sexual dimorphism is prominent; the males are larger than females and differ in size and colouration.

The maximum recorded length of the skull is 376 mm (14.8 in). The dental formula is 0.0.3.33.1.3.3. The milk teeth are totally lost and the permanent dentition completed by three years of age. The permanent teeth get degraded with age, showing prominent signs of wear at six years of age. The nilgai has keen senses of vision and hearinng, though its sense of smell is not acute.

== Distribution and habitat ==
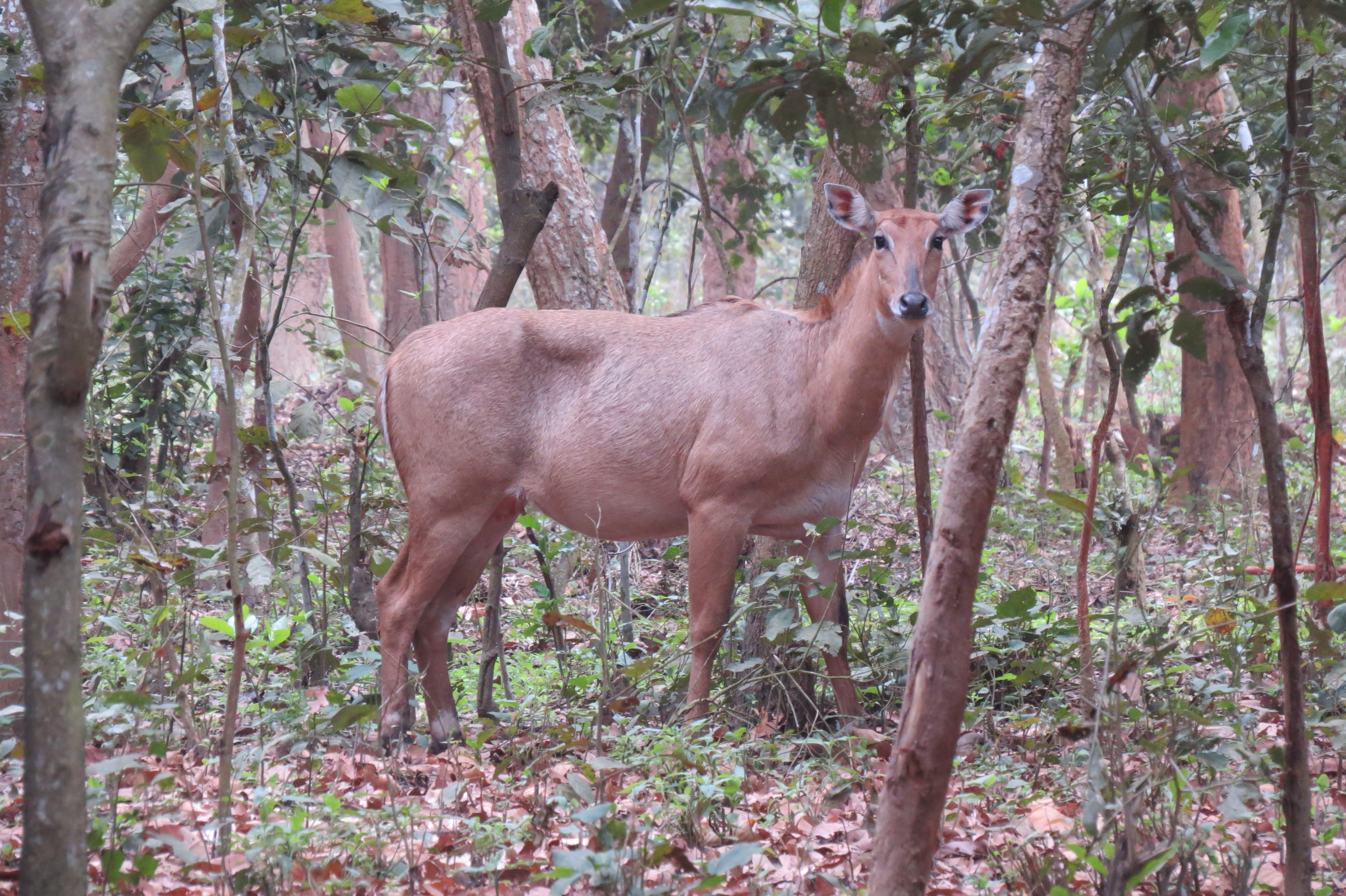
A nilgai female in Pilibhit Tiger Reserve, Uttar Pradesh

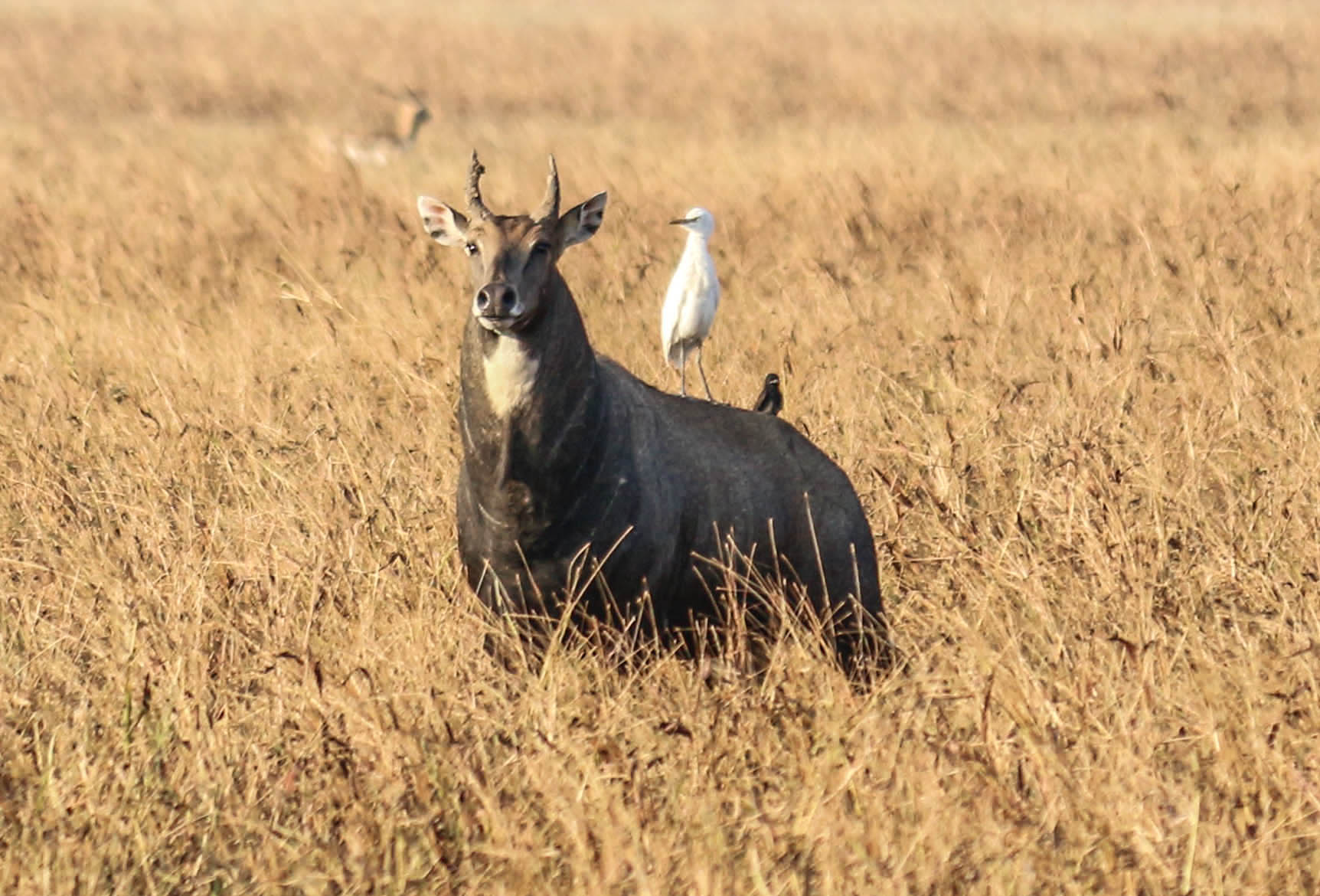
Nilgai prefer areas with low bushes.

The nilgai is endemic to the Indian subcontinent; major populations occur in India, Nepal, and border areas of Pakistan. Significant numbers occur in the Terai lowlands in the foothills of the Himalayas; it is abundant across northern India. It prefers areas with short bushes and scattered trees in scrub forests and grassy plains. They are common in agricultural lands, but hardly occur in dense woods. It is a generalist animal; it can adapt to a variety of habitats. Though sedentary and less dependent on water, nilgai may desert their territories if all water sources in and around it dry up.

Population densities show great geographical variation across India. Density can be as low as 0.23 to 0.34 individuals per km^{2} in Indravati National Park. and 0.4 per km^{2} in the Pench Tiger Reserve, or as high as 6.6 to 11.36 per km^{2} in Ranthambhore National Park, and 7.0 individuals per km^{2} in Keoladeo National Park. Seasonal variations were noted in Bardiya National Park in a 1980 study; the density 3.2 per km^{2} during the dry season and 5 per km^{2} in April, the start of the dry season.

The Indian population was estimated at one million in 2001.

The population in Bangladesh was thought to be extinct, but some individuals from India and Nepal have crossed the border into the northwest of the country. Historic notes mention nilgai in southern India, but these may have been feral:

I believe that the Coimbatore and Salem collectorates are almost the only places in Southern India, in which nil-gai are to be found. It is difficult to account for the animals being thus so widely divided from their usual haunts unless as has been generally supposed, these Southern specimens are the progeny of a semi-domesticated herd, which, at some by-gone period, had escaped from the preserve of a native potentate.

— Andrew Cooke McMaster (Notes on Jerdon's Mammals of India, 1871)

Nilgai are also living ferally in the United States of America, mostly in Southern Texas, where densities were found to be 3–5 per km^{2} in 1976 and territories are 0.6 to 8.1 km^{2} (0.23 to 3.13 sq mi) in area. Feral populations also exist in the US states of Alabama, Florida and Mississippi and the Mexican state of Tamaulipas, where they have escaped from private exotic ranches. They were first introduced to Texas in 1924, by Caesar Kleberg, onto a 6,000 acres (2,400 ha) ranch near the Norias Division of the King Ranch, one of the largest ranches in the world. The feral population had a spurt toward the latter part of the 1940s, and gradually spread out to adjoining ranches.

The feral nilgai roam and graze the prairies, scrub forests and oak forests. They are hunted for sports, trophies, and food. It is a matter of public debate whether they should be treated as an asset (for their use in hunting and food) or a problematic invasive species. As of 2008, the population size in Texas was nearly 37,000, while in 2021 it was given as nearly 50,000 in a paper about cattle fever ticks. Nilgai have been found to be hosts of the tick Rhipicephalus microplus that was subject to eradication in the US, contributing to their spread throughout the Texan South. While cattle fever ticks have been mostly eradicated in the US, they haven't been in Mexico. The nilgai population close to the Texas–Mexico border was estimated to be around 30,000 in 2011.

== Behavior and ecology ==
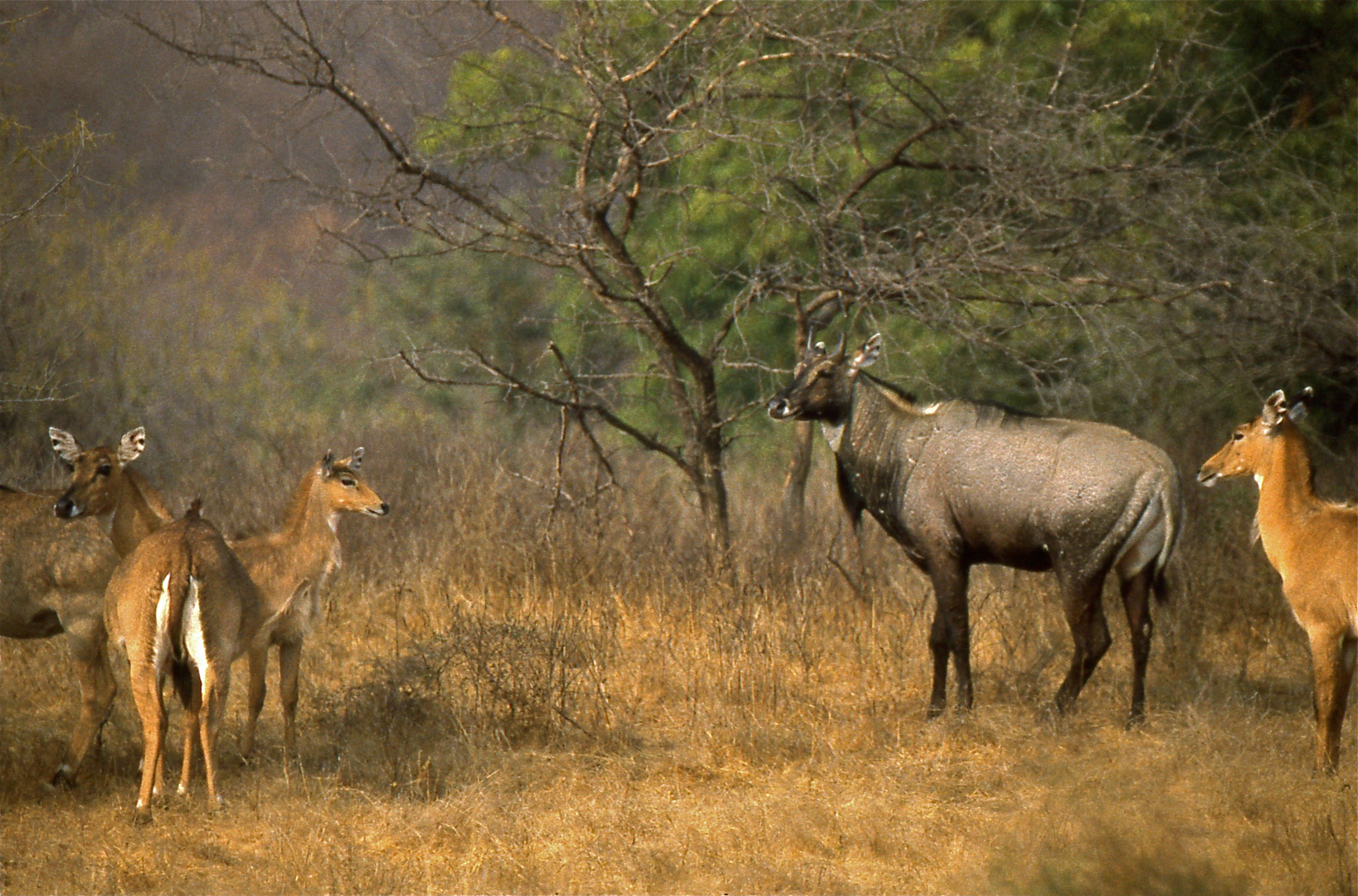
A herd of nilgai in Ranthambore National Park, Rajasthan, India

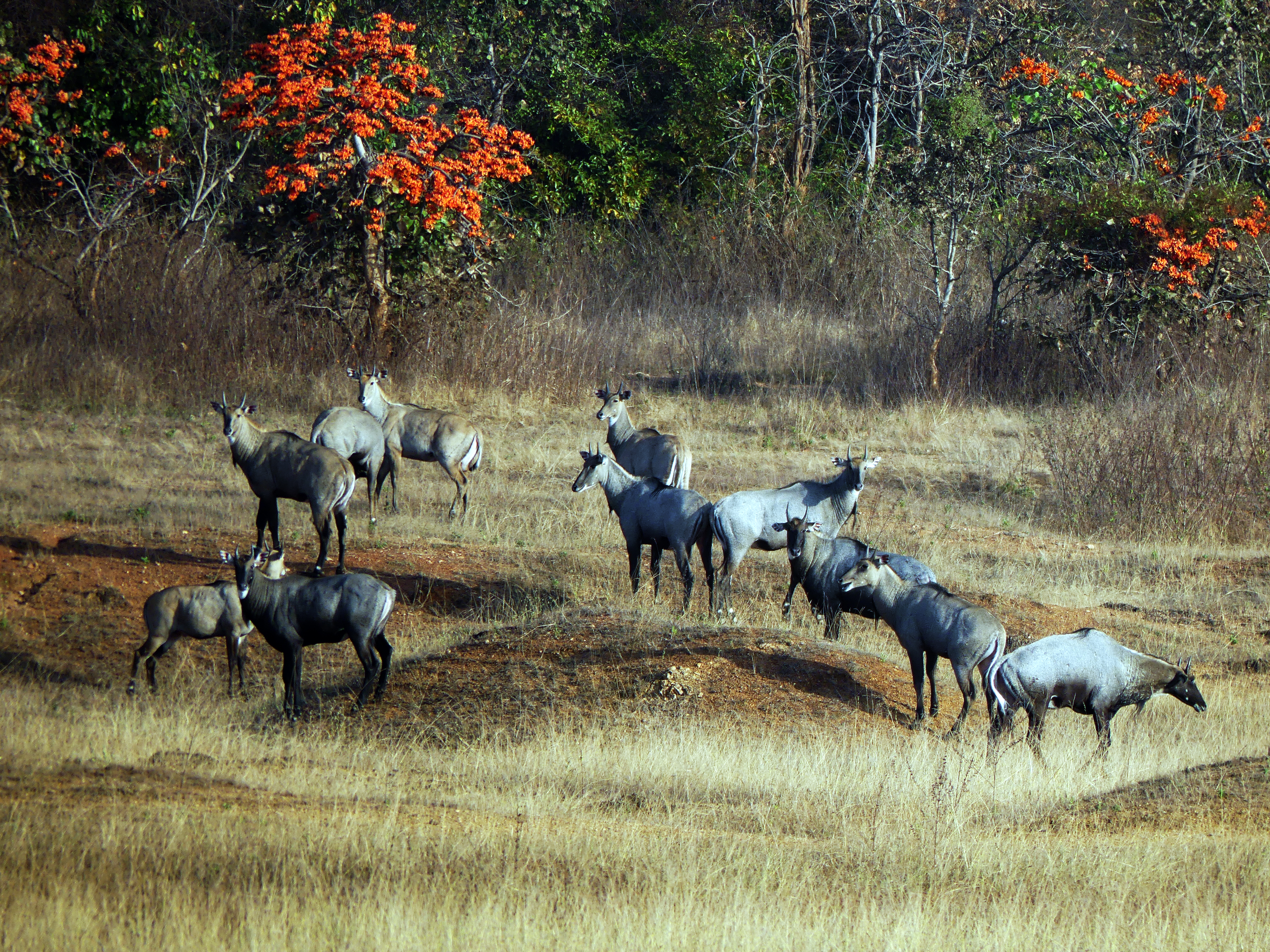
A group of nilgai in Umred Pauni Karhandla Wildlife Sanctuary, Maharashtra

The nilgai is diurnal (active mainly during the day). A 1991 study investigated the daily routine of the antelope and found feeding peaks at dawn, in the morning, in the afternoon, and during the evening. Females and juveniles do not interact appreciably with males, except during the mating season. Groups are generally small, with 10 or fewer individuals, though groups of 20 to 70 individuals can occur at times. In a 1980 study in Bardiya National Park, the average herd size was of three; In a 1995 study in the Gir National Park, herd membership varied with season. However, three distinct groupings are formed: one or two females with young calves, three to six adult and yearling females with calves, and male groups with two to 18 members.

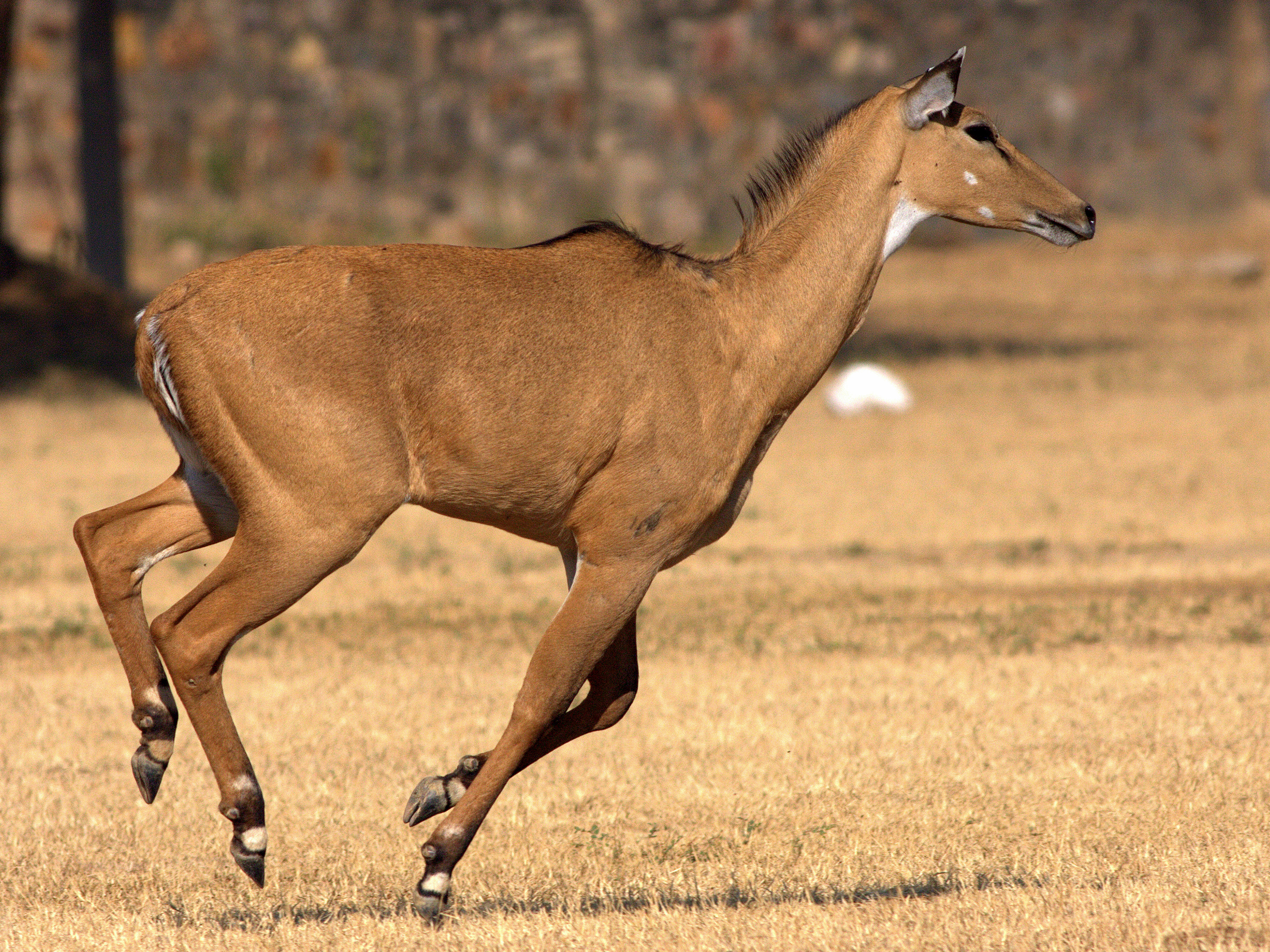
A nilgai running

Typically tame, the nilgai may appear timid and cautious if harassed or alarmed; instead of seeking cover like duikers it would flee up to 300 metres (980 ft)-or even 700 metres (2,300 ft) on galloping-away from the danger. Though generally quiet, nilgai have been reported to make short guttural grunts when alarmed, and females make clicking noises when nursing young. Alarmed individuals, mainly juveniles below five months, give out a coughing roar (whose pitch is highest in case of the juveniles) that lasts half a second, but can be heard by herds less than 500 m (1,600 ft) away and responded to similarly.

Fights take place in both sexes and involve pushing their necks against each other or ramming into one another using horns. Fights can be gory; despite the protective skin deep, lacerated wounds and even deaths might occur. Display behaviour focuses on the throat patch and the beard, and threatening opponents by pointing the horns toward them. A young male was observed making a submissive display in the Sariska Reserve by kneeling before an adult male that stood erect. Nilgai mark their territories by forming dung piles as much as 50 cm (20 in) in radius. The defecation process is elaborate; the antelope stands with its legs about 1 m apart, with the rump lowered and the tail held almost vertical; it stays in the same posture for at least 10 seconds after relieving itself. The process is not as elaborate in the females as it is in the males.

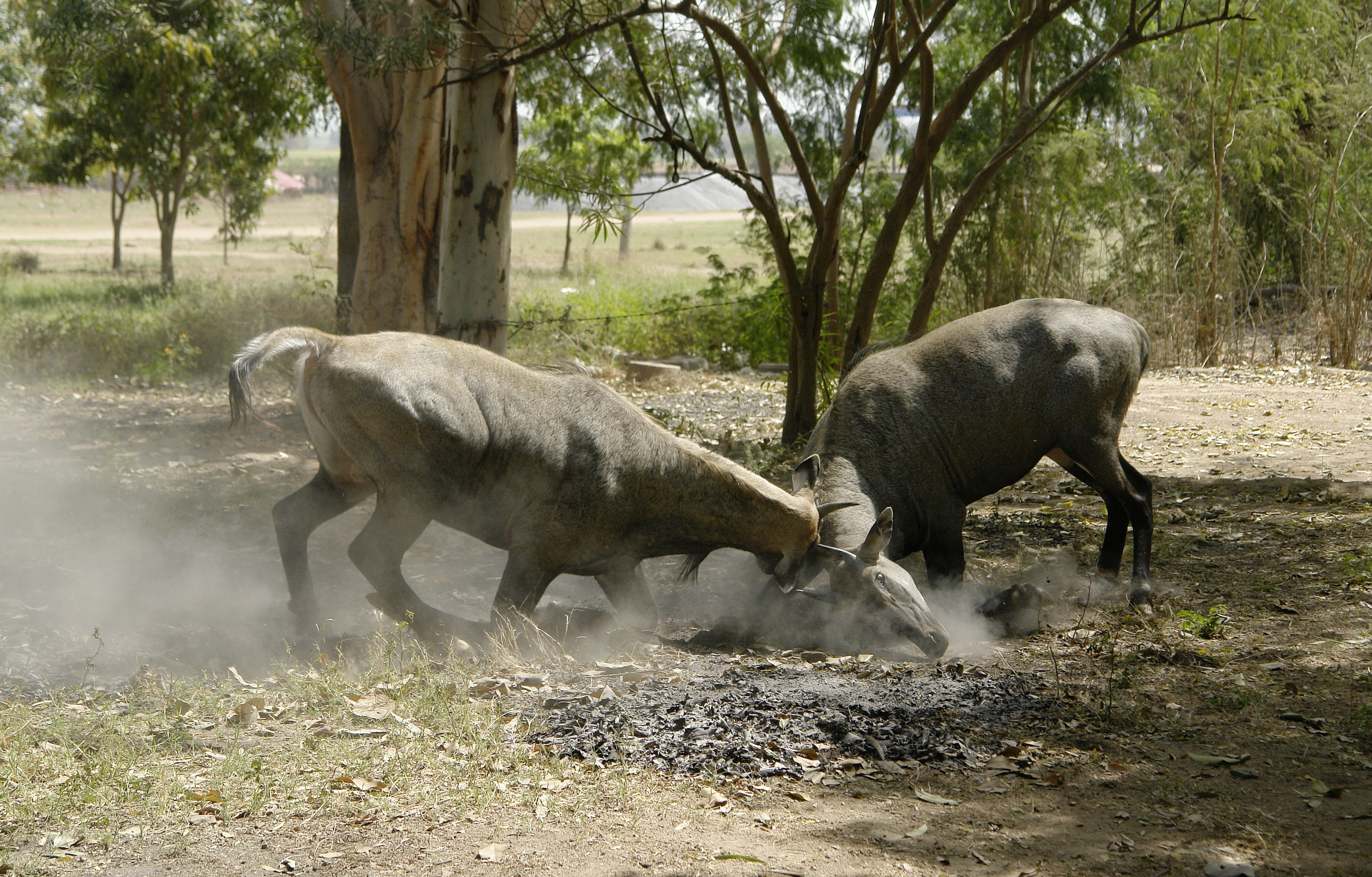
Sparring males

In India, the nilgai shares its habitat with the four-horned antelope, chinkara, chital, and blackbuck; its association with the gaur and the water buffalo is less common. In Ranthambore National Park, the nilgai and the chinkara collectively prefer the area rich in Acacia and Butea species, while the sambar deer and the chital preferred the forests of Anogeissus and Grewia species. In India, the Bengal tiger, the Indian wolf, the striped hyena, and the Asiatic lion prey on the nilgai, though the latter is not a significant predator of this antelope. Leopards also prey on the nilgai, though they prefer smaller prey. Dholes generally attack juveniles.

=== Diet ===
The nilgai is originally a browser or mixed feeder, but primarily a grazer in Texas. It prefers grasses and herbs, but also feeds on woody plants in the dry tropical forests of India. Diets generally suffice in protein and fats. The protein content of the nilgai's should be at least seven percent. The nilgai can survive for long periods without water and does not drink regularly even in summer.

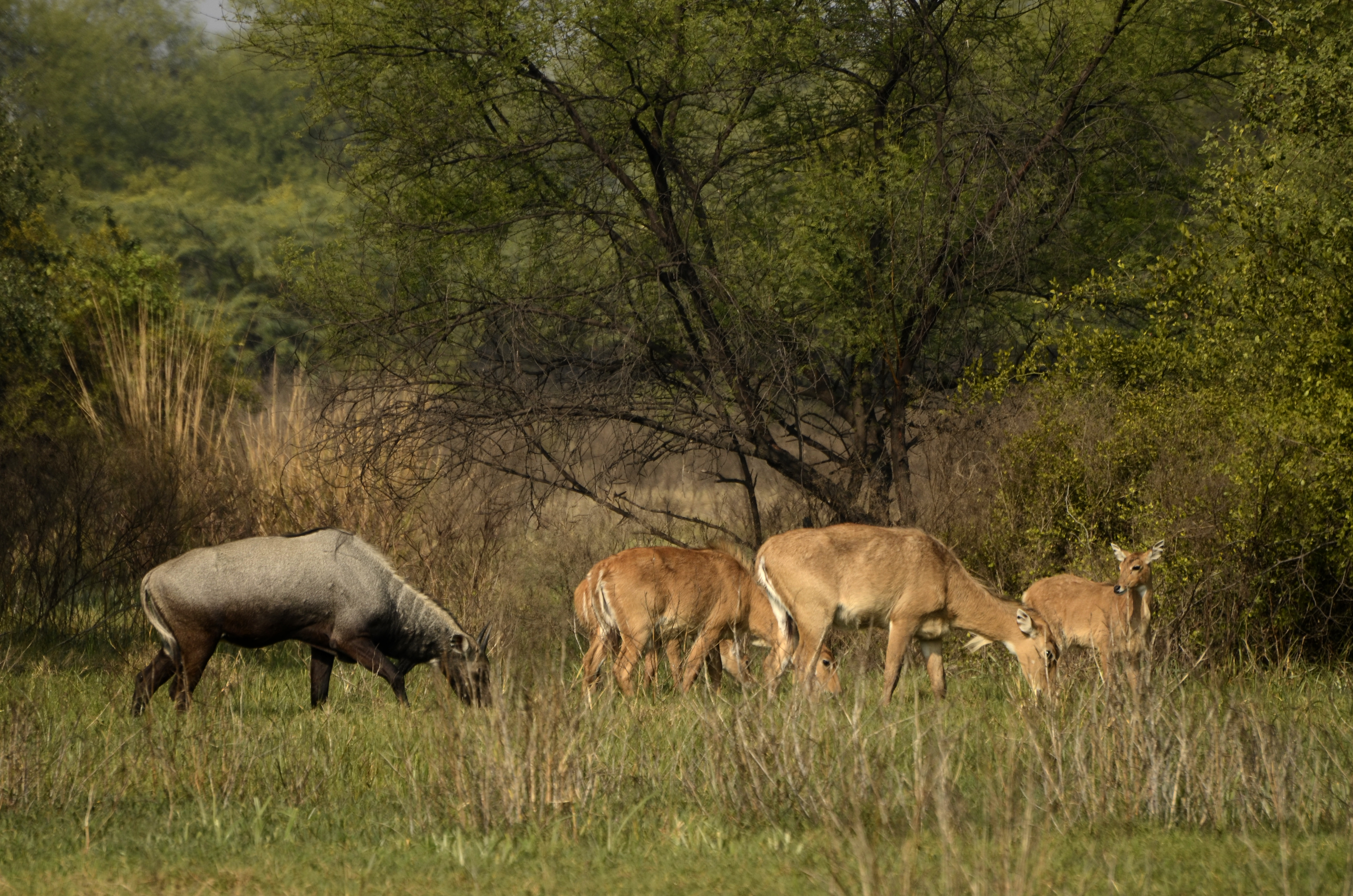
A herd of nilgai grazing in Keoladeo National Park, Rajasthan

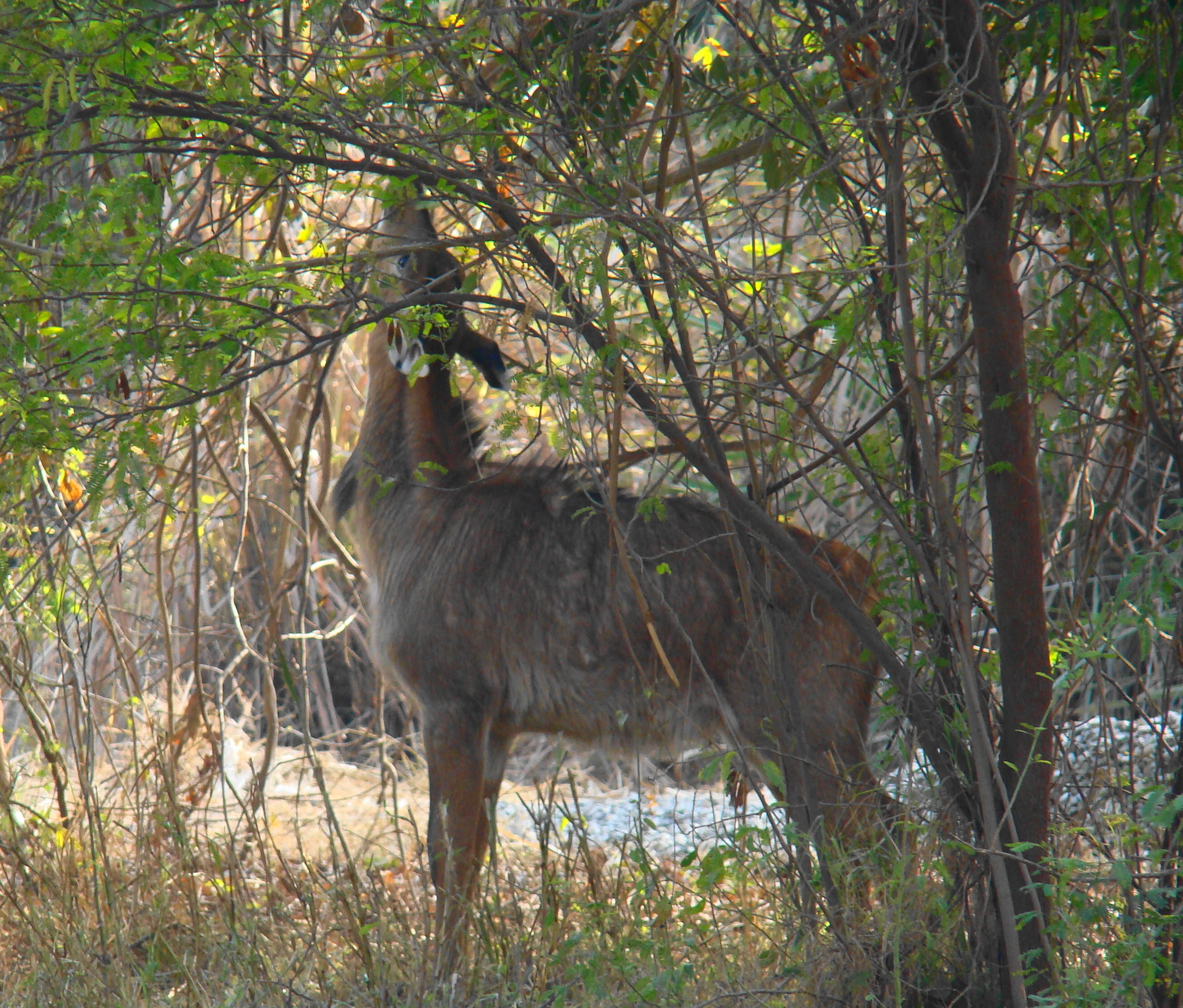
Nilgai can reach for high branches.

In Sariska Reserve, it prefers herbs and grasses; grasses become more important in the rainy season, while during winter and summer it feeds additionally on Butea monosperma flowers, foliage of Anogeissus pendula, Capparis sepiaria, Grewia flavescens and Zizyphus mauritiana), pods of Acacia nilotica, A. catechu and A. leucophloea, and fruits of Zizyphus mauritiana. Preferred grass species include Cenchrus species, Cynodon dactylon, Desmostachya bipinnata, Scirpus tuberosus and Vetiveria zizanoides. Woody plants eaten include Acacia nilotica, A. senegal, A. leucophloea, Clerodendrum phlomidis, Crotalaria burhia, Indigofera oblongifolia, Morus alba and Zizyphus nummularia; herbs favoured are Cocculus hirsutus, Euphorbia hirta and Sida rhombifolia. Seeds of Paspalum distichum occurred in the dung of nilgai most of the year; Acacia nilotica and Prosopis juliflora seeds were discovered in the dry season and those of Echinochloa crusgalli during the monsoon.

=== Reproduction ===
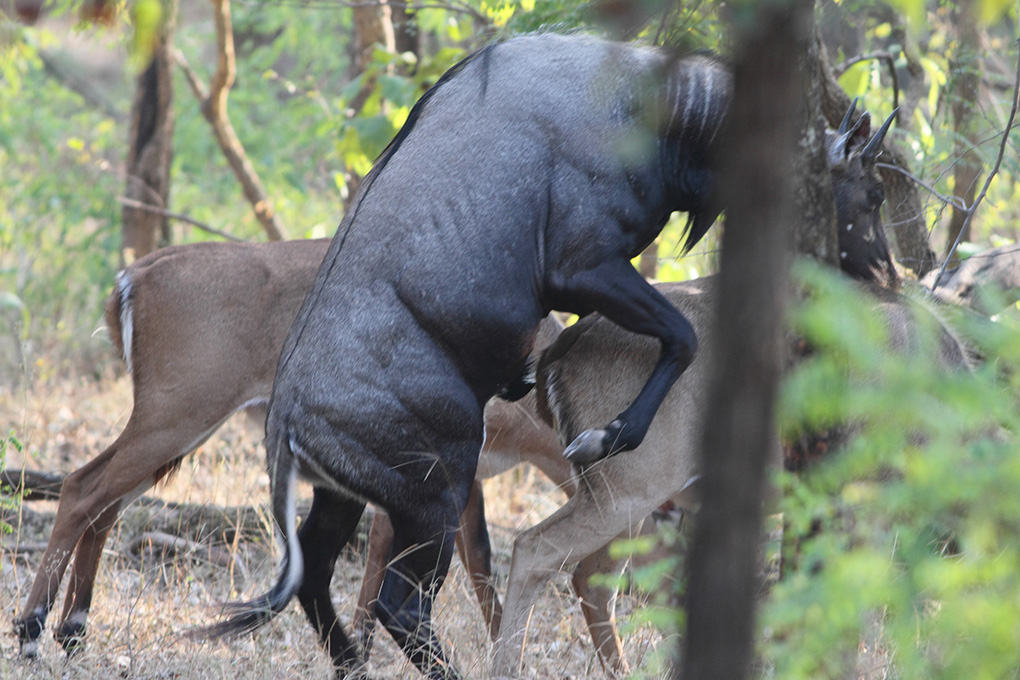
Nilgai mating

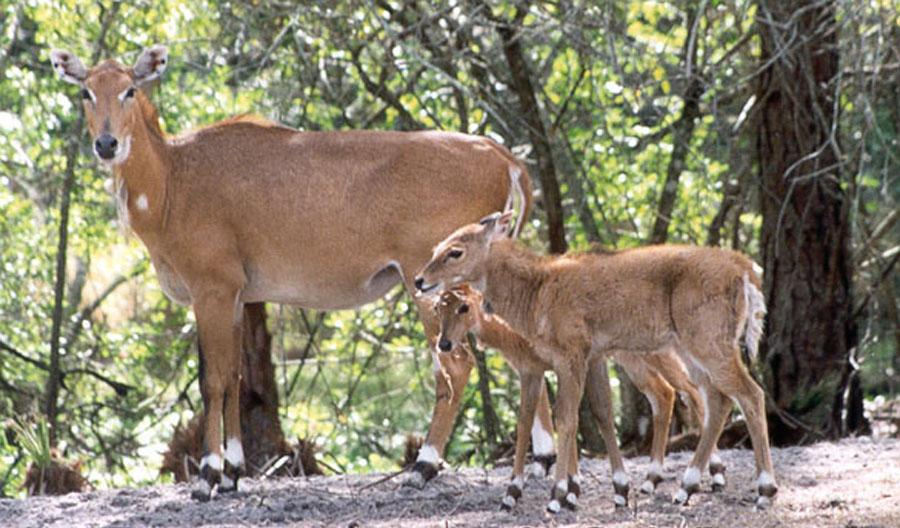
A mother with her calves

Observations of females in southern Texas revealed that ovaries are developed by two years of age and the first birth takes place typically a year later, though in a few cases females as young as one-and-a-half years may mate successfully. Females can breed again around a year after parturition. Males in the same location were found to have active testes by the age of three years, that matured considerably by the next year. Males become sexually active at four or five years. Mating may occur throughout the year, with peaks of three to four months. The time of the year when these peaks occur varies geographically. In Texas, a peak is apparent from December to March. In Bharatpur National Park, the breeding season is from October to February, peaking in November and December. Sariska reserve witnesses a similar peak in December and January. In the mating season, rutting males move about in search of females in oestrus. Males become aggressive and fight among themselves for dominance. These fights are characterised by displays of the enlarged chest, the throat patch and the beard while holding the head upright; and threatening the opponent by running with the horns pointed toward him and circling him. The victorious bull would protect the vicinity of the targeted female from other males. The courtship typically lasts for 45 minutes. The male, stiff and composed, approaches the receptive female, who keeps her head low to the ground and may slowly walk forward. The male licks her genitalia, upon which the female holds her tail to a side and the male gives out a flehmen response. Finally, the male pushes his chest against her rump, and mounts her.

Gestation lasts eight to nine months, following which a single calf or twins (even triplets at times) are born. In a 2004 study in the Sariska reserve, twins accounted for as high as 80 percent of the total calf population. Births peak from June to October in the Bharatpur National Park, and from April to August in southern Texas. Calves are precocial; they are able to stand within 40 minutes of birth, and forage by the fourth week. Pregnant females isolate themselves before giving birth. As typical of several bovid species, nilgai calves are kept in hiding for the first few weeks of their lives. This period of concealment can last as long as a month in Texas. Calves, mainly males, bicker playfully by neck-fighting. Young males would leave their mothers at ten months to join bachelor groups. The lifespan of the nilgai is typically ten years in Texas.

== Threats and conservation ==
The nilgai is listed as least concern on the International Union for Conservation of Nature's Red List, and on Appendix III of CITES. While it is common in India, the nilgai occurs sparsely in Nepal and Pakistan. The major reasons behind its decimation in these two countries are rampant hunting, deforestation and habitat degradation in the 20th century.

In India, the nilgai is protected under Schedule III of the Wildlife Protection Act of 1972. Major protected areas for the nilgai across India include: Gir National Park (Gujarat); Bandhavgarh National Park, Bori Wildlife Sanctuary, Kanha National Park, Pachmarhi Biosphere Reserve, Panna Tiger Reserve, Pench Tiger Reserve, Sanjay National Park, Satpura National Park (Madhya Pradesh); Tadoba Andhari Reserve (Maharashtra); Kumbhalgarh Wildlife Sanctuary, Sultanpur National Park in Gurgaon, Ranthambore National Park and Sariska Tiger Reserve (Rajasthan).

== Cultural significance ==
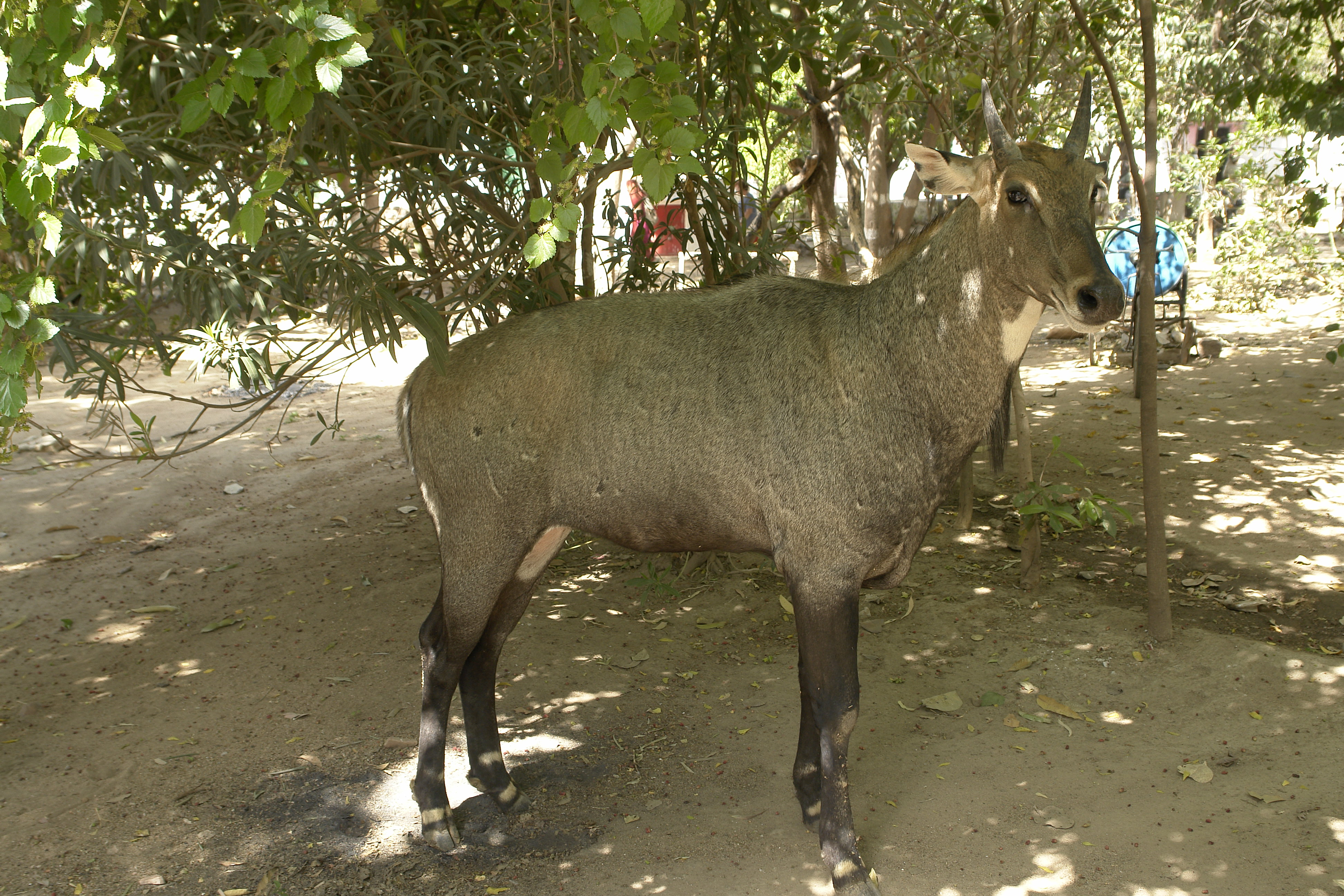
Tamed nilgai in Gwalior district

Nilgai remains have been excavated at Pandu Rajar Dhibi in West Bengal, suggesting that it was domesticated or hunted in eastern India in the Neolithic period (6500–1400 BCE) and during the Indus Valley Civilisation (3300–1700 BCE). There is a reference to the nilgai in the Aitareya Brahmana (a Hindu religious text dated 500–1000 BCE), where one of the Prajapatis is said to have assumed the form of a nilgai:

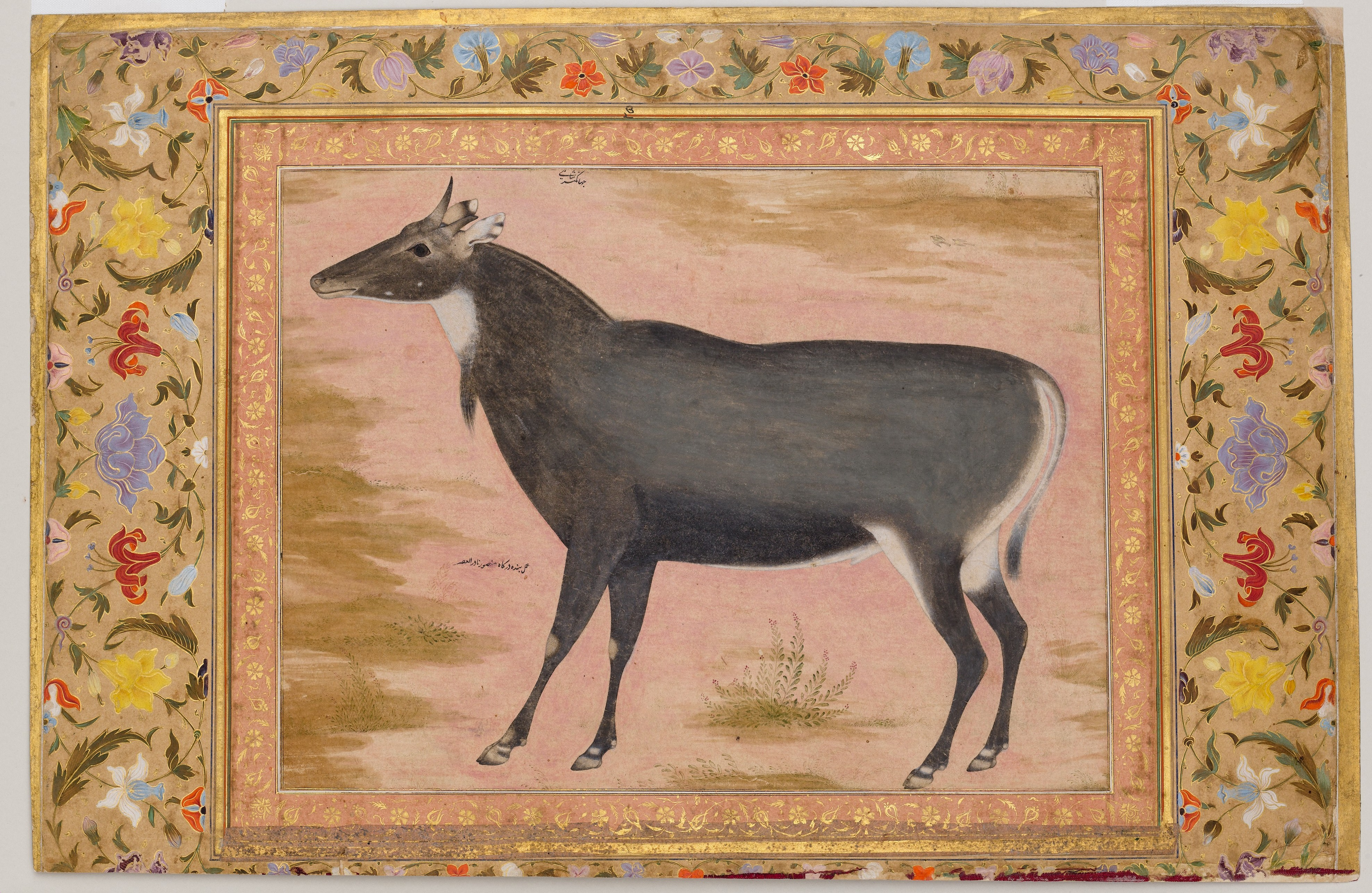
Nilgai illustrated by Ustad Mansur for Jahangir (1605–1627), c. 1620

The nilgai is extensively featured in paintings, dagger hilts and texts from the Mughal era; its representation, however, is less frequent than that of horses and camels. On being disturbed while hunting nilgai, the Mughal emperor Jahangir recorded his ire.

For centuries, Indian villagers have associated the nilgai with the cow, a sacred animal revered by Hindus, and the name ("gai" means "cow" in Hindi) indicates the similarity they saw with the cow. The nilgai is rarely consumed by Hindus due to its religious significance. Tribes such as the Bishnois traditionally take care of wild animals like the nilgai. The nilgai was not widely hunted until the 20th century, when habitat degradation and poaching became rampant. The meat of nilgai is said to be lighter and milder flavoured than blackbuck meat.

=== Culling and conservation ===
The populations of nilgai in India are so large that farmers in the states of Bihar, Chhattisgarh, Haryana, Madhya Pradesh, Maharashtra, Rajasthan and Uttar Pradesh have pleaded to the government to cull them. Nilgai herds raid and trample crop fields across these states, often causing food shortages. Farmers use live electric wires to guard their farms, which kills other animals as well. Farmers in Neemuch (Madhya Pradesh) went on a hunger strike in 2015 demanding compensation for the damage caused by nilgai. Although blackbuck cause a similar problem, the damage caused by them is significantly lower as they merely break off young shoots. In 1990, it was suggested that culling, building enclosures for the antelopes and fencing off agricultural areas as remedies.

The governments of Bihar, Maharashtra and Uttarakhand have urged the Government of India to declare the nilgai as vermin; the proposal has been implemented in Bihar, where nilgai can now be hunted to minimise the damages incurred by locals. The Uttar Pradesh government has given farmers and firearm licence holders the right to cull the animals. However, animal rights activists in various parts of India were unhappy with the decision. Shivanshu K. Srivastava, a columnist and social activist, wrote that "The culling of nilgais (blue bulls) in Bihar in July 2016 was so deplorable that it doesn't need any justification. The excuse given for this slew by the State government, the then environment minister Prakash Javadekar and the judiciary is so illogical that it mocks all the solutions available to stop the nilgais from destroying the farms. We live in the 21st century and culling is only the very last option we have. The farmers can either opt for fencing around the farmlands or if it is unaffordable, then the government can give ordinances to relocate them to the forests." The state governments have attempted other initiatives to curb the nilgai: in November 2015, the Government of Rajasthan came up with a proposal to allow shooting nilgai with non-lethal darts to inhibit fertilisation in their bodies, so as to regulate their increasing populations. As the name "nilgai" appeals to the religious sentiments of Hindus, the Government of Madhya Pradesh has sought to officially rename it rojad (Hindi for "forest antelope") and the Government of Haryana to rename it as roze in a bid to make their culling acceptable. in 1994, it became known that the nilgai's faeces contains nearly 1.6 percent nitrogen, which could enhance the quality of the soil up to a depth of 30 centimetres (12 in). Seeds in the droppings could easily germinate and assist in afforestation.

In September 2019, a video surfaced of a nilgai being buried alive with an excavator in Bihar as part of the culling. The state forest department has claimed to have begun an investigation to find those responsible.
