= Menispermum canadense =

Canadian moonseed
- Menispermum canadense

Conservation status
- Secure (NatureServe)

Scientific classification
- Kingdom: Plantae
- Clade: Tracheophytes
- Clade: Angiosperms
- Clade: Eudicots
- Order: Ranunculales
- Family: Menispermaceae
- Genus: Menispermum
- Species: M. canadense

Binomial name
- Menispermum canadense L.

Synonyms
- Menispermum mexicanum Rose

Species of plant

Menispermum canadense, the Canadian moonseed, common moonseed, or yellow parilla, is a species of flowering plant in the family Menispermaceae, native to eastern North America, from southern Canada south to northern Florida, and from the Atlantic coast west to Manitoba and Texas. It occurs in thickets, moist woods, and the banks of streams.

== Description ==
It is a woody climbing vine growing to 6 metres (20 feet) tall. The leaves are palmately lobed, 5–20 centimetres (2–8 inches) in diameter with 3–7 shallow lobes, occasionally rounded and unlobed. The fruit are produced in 6–10 cm (2 1/4–4 in) diameter clusters of purple-black berries, each berry is 1–1.5 cm (1/3–2/3 in) in diameter. The seed inside the berry resembles a crescent moon, and is responsible for the common name. The fruit is ripe between September and October, the same general time frame in which wild grapes are ripe. Both the leaves and fruit resemble those of grapes; confusion can be dangerous as moonseed fruit is poisonous.

The root is a rhizome, so one specimen can form colonies of genetically identical plants.

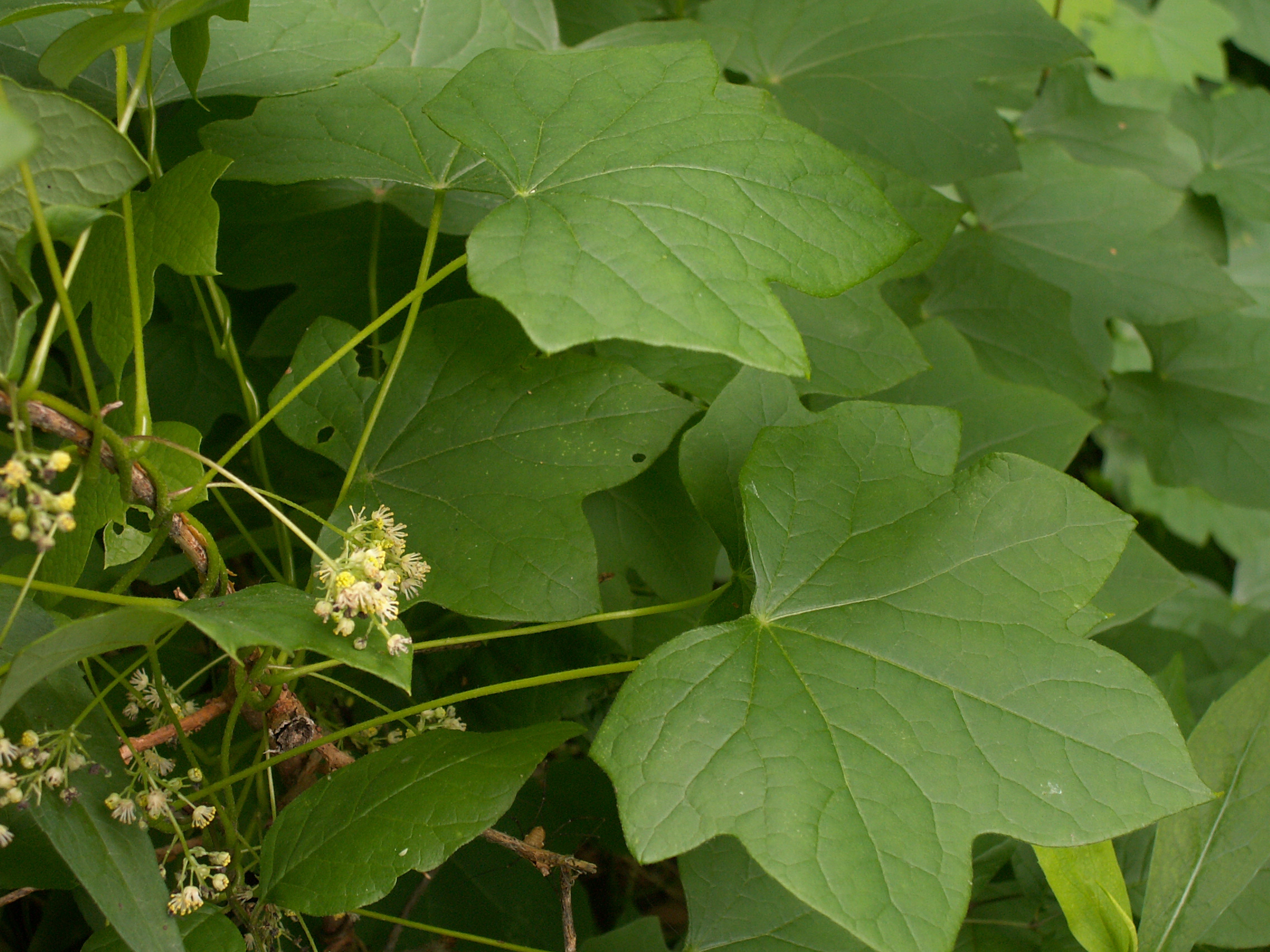
In bloom

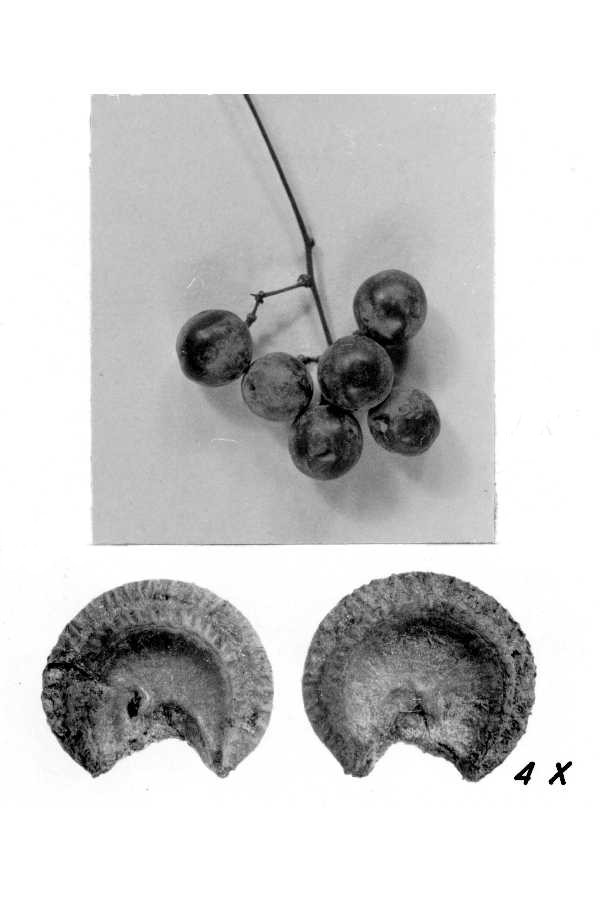
Fruit and seed (seed magnified 4x relative to fruit)

== Toxicity ==
All parts of these plants are known to be poisonous. The principal toxin is the alkaloid dauricine. The fruit of Canadian moonseed are poisonous and can be fatal. While foraging for wild grapes, one should examine the seeds of the fruit to make sure one is not eating moonseeds: moonseeds have a single crescent-shaped seed, while grapes have round seeds. Differences in taste should also be an indicator of whether or not a specimen is grape or moonseed, moonseeds have a taste that is described as "rank". Also, the moonseed vine lacks tendrils, whilst the vine of the wild grape has forked tendrils.

== Uses ==
The Cherokee used moonseed as a laxative, and as a gynecological and venereal aid. The root was used for skin diseases. The Lenape used it in a salve for sores on the skin. It has been used for a variety of medicinal uses by Americans of European descent.
