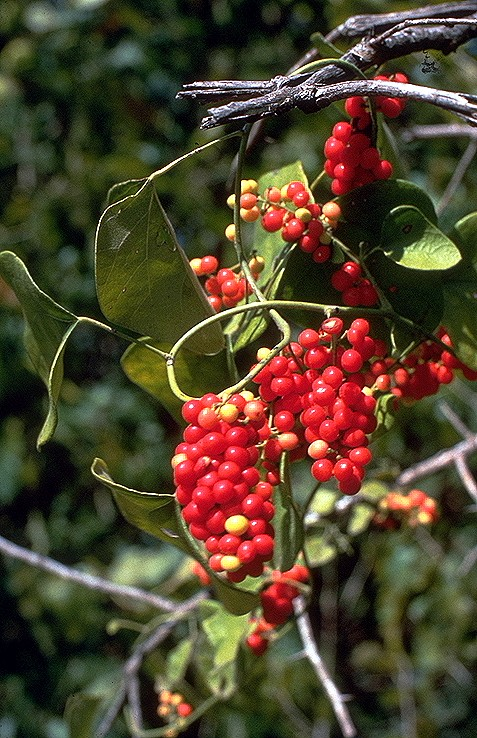
- N. carolina

Scientific classification
- Kingdom: Plantae
- Clade: Tracheophytes
- Clade: Angiosperms
- Clade: Eudicots
- Order: Ranunculales
- Family: Menispermaceae
- Genus: Nephroia; Lour. (1790), nom. rej.

Species
- Nephroia carolina (L.) L.Lian & Wei Wang; Nephroia diversifolia (DC.) L.Lian & Wei Wang; Nephroia orbiculata (L.) L.Lian & Wei Wang

Synonyms
- Androphylax J.C.Wendl. (1798); Baumgartia Moench (1794); Cocculidium Spach (1839); Ferrandia Gaudich. (1829); Wendlandia Willd. (1799), nom. rej.

= Nephroia =

Genus of flowering plants

Nephroia is a genus of flowering plants in the family Menispermaceae. It includes three species with a disjunct distribution, with two species in Mexico and the southern and central United States, and one species which ranges from eastern Asia to the South Pacific.

== Species ==
- Nephroia carolina (L.) L.Lian & Wei Wang – red-berried moonseed or Carolina moonseed, Kansas and Indiana through the southern United States to northeastern Mexico
- Nephroia diversifolia (DC.) L.Lian & Wei Wang – southern Arizona and southern Texas to southwestern Mexico
- Nephroia orbiculata (L.) L.Lian & Wei Wang – Himalayas to Japan and the Central Pacific
