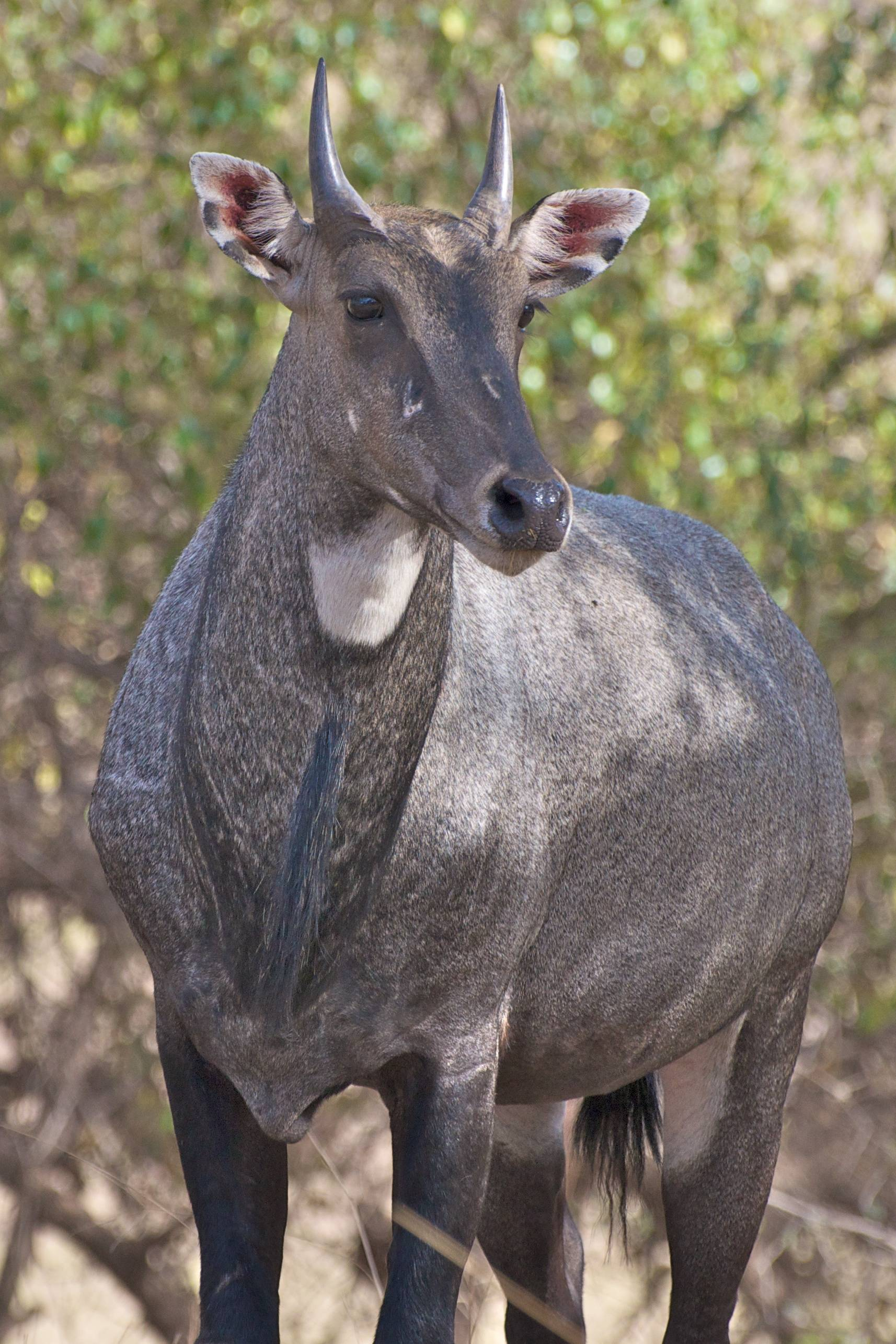
- Nilgai (Boselaphus tragocamelus)

Scientific classification
- Kingdom: Animalia
- Phylum: Chordata
- Class: Mammalia
- Order: Artiodactyla
- Family: Bovidae
- Subfamily: Bovinae
- Tribe: Boselaphini
- Genus: Boselaphus; Blainville, 1816

Type species
- Boselaphus tragocamelus (Pallas, 1766)

Species
- Boselaphus tragocamelus - Nilgai; †Boselaphus namadicus

Synonyms
- Portax

= Boselaphus =

Boselaphus Temporal range: 3.4–0 Ma Late Pliocene-Recent

Genus of mammals

Boselaphus is a genus of bovid. The nilgai is the sole living representative, although one other species (Boselaphus namadicus) is known from the fossil record.

The nilgai along with the four-horned antelope are the only living members of the tribe Boselaphini.
