= Nephroia diversifolia =

Conservation status
- Apparently Secure (NatureServe)

Scientific classification
- Kingdom: Plantae
- Clade: Tracheophytes
- Clade: Angiosperms
- Clade: Eudicots
- Order: Ranunculales
- Family: Menispermaceae
- Genus: Nephroia
- Species: N. diversifolia

Binomial name
- Nephroia diversifolia (DC.) L.Lian & Wei Wang (2020)

Synonyms
- Cebatha diversifolia (DC.) Kuntze (1891); Cebatha miqueliana Kuntze (1891); Cocculus diversifolius DC. (1817); Cocculus oblongifolius DC. (1817); Epibaterium diversifolium (DC.) Tidestr. (1935); Menispermum oblongifolium (DC.) Spreng. (1825)

Species of flowering plant

Nephroia diversifolia is a vine with the common name sarsaparilla or correjuela. It is native to Arizona, Texas, and much of Mexico as far south as Oaxaca. It is a vine climbing up to 3 m, with white to yellowish flowers and dark purple fruits up to 6 mm in diameter.
