= Dauricine =

Names
- Preferred IUPAC name (1^{1}R,7^{1}R)-1^{6},1^{7},7^{6},7^{7}-Tetramethoxy-1^{2},7^{2}-dimethyl-1^{1},1^{2},1^{3},1^{4},7^{1},7^{2},7^{3},7^{4}-octahydro-4-oxa-1,7(1)-diisoquinolina-3(1,3),5(1,4)-dibenzenaheptaphan-3^{4}-ol

Identifiers
CAS Number	524-17-4
3D model (JSmol)	Interactive image
ChEBI	CHEBI:4331
ChEMBL	ChEMBL442717
ChemSpider	66117
ECHA InfoCard	100.208.622
PubChem CID	73400
UNII	8QTO90G5W5
CompTox Dashboard (EPA)	DTXSID90966808
- InChI: InChI=1/C38H44N2O6/c1-39-15-13-26-20-35(42-3)37(44-5)22-29(26)31(39)17-24-7-10-28(11-8-24)46-34-19-25(9-12-33(34)41)18-32-30-23-38(45-6)36(43-4)21-27(30)14-16-40(32)2/h7-12,19-23,31-32,41H,13-18H2,1-6H3/t31-,32-/m1/s1 Key: AQASRZOCERRGBL-ROJLCIKYBP
- SMILES: O(c1cc2c(cc1OC)[C@H](N(C)CC2)Cc6ccc(Oc3c(O)ccc(c3)C[C@@H]5c4c(cc(OC)c(OC)c4)CCN5C)cc6)C

Properties
Chemical formula	C_{38}H_{44}N_{2}O_{6}
Molar mass	624.778 g·mol^{−1}
Density	1.186 g/mL
Melting point	115 °C
- Except where otherwise noted, data are given for materials in their standard state (at 25 °C [77 °F], 100 kPa). Infobox references

Dauricine is a plant metabolite, chemically classified as a phenol, an aromatic ether, and an isoquinoline alkaloid. It has been isolated from the Asian vine Menispermum dauricum, Asian moonseed, and the North American vine Menispermum canadense, Canadian moonseed. Scientists Tetsuji Kametani and Keiichiro Fukumoto of Japan are credited with being the first to synthesize dauricine in 1964, using both the Arndt-Eistert reaction and Bischler-Napieralski reaction to do so. Dauricine has been studied in vitro for its potential to inhibit cancer cell growth and to block cardiac transmembrane Na^{+}, K^{+}, and Ca^{2+} ion currents.
