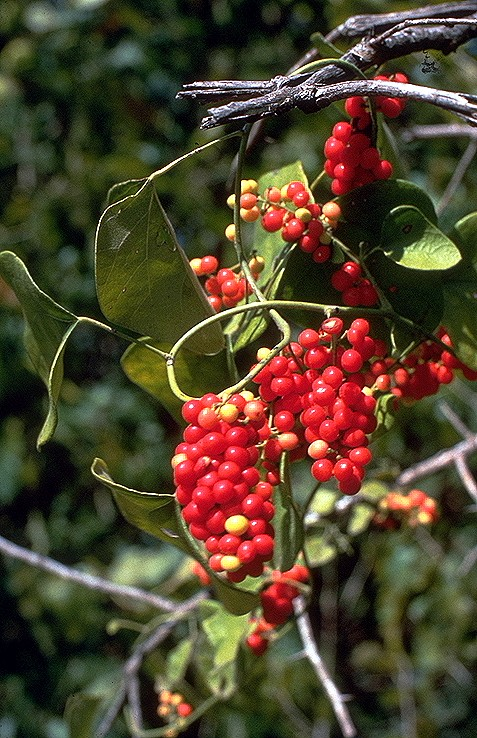

Scientific classification
- Kingdom: Plantae
- Clade: Tracheophytes
- Clade: Angiosperms
- Clade: Eudicots
- Order: Ranunculales
- Family: Menispermaceae
- Genus: Nephroia
- Species: N. carolina

Binomial name
- Nephroia carolina (L.) L.Lian & Wei Wang (2020)

Synonyms
- Synonymy: Androphylax scandens J.C.Wendl. (1798); Baumgartia scandens Moench (1794); Caesalpinia smilacea Steud. (1840), not validly publ.; Cebatha carolina (L.) Britton (1894); Cebatha sagittifolia (Miers) Kuntze (1891); Cebatha virginica (L.) Kuntze (1891); Cocculidium populifolium Spach (1839); Cocculus carolinianus Anon. (1886); Cocculus carolinus (L.) DC. (1817); Cocculus enneandra Eichler (1864); Cocculus sagittifolius Miers (1871); Epibaterium carolinum (L.) Britton (1913); Menispermum carolinianum Hill (1770), orth. var.; Menispermum carolinum L. (1753); Menispermum virginicum L. (1753); Wendlandia caroliniana Nutt. (1818); Wendlandia populifolia Willd. (1799)

= Nephroia carolina =

Species of flowering plant

Nephroia carolina, commonly called the Carolina coralbead, snailseed, Carolina Moonseed, or Margil's Vine, is a perennial vine of the moonseed family (Menispermaceae). It is native to North America, where it is found in northeastern Mexico and in several states in the United States from the Southeast to the Midwest.

The species' common name derives from the appearance of its small, rounded red fruits, and the rough half-moon shape of its seeds.

== Description ==
Nephroia carolina is a climbing woody vine reaching 5 meters (16 ft) or more. It produces ovate or triangle-shaped leaves, although the leaf shape is highly variable. Fruits and flowers are borne on axillary cymes. The male and female flowers are small and green, appearing on different plants. The bright red fruit, a drupe, appears from June to August. It reaches 8 mm (0.31 in) in size. Each fruit has a single seed that resembles a small snail shell, protected by the hard endocarp or the inner section of the ovary wall.

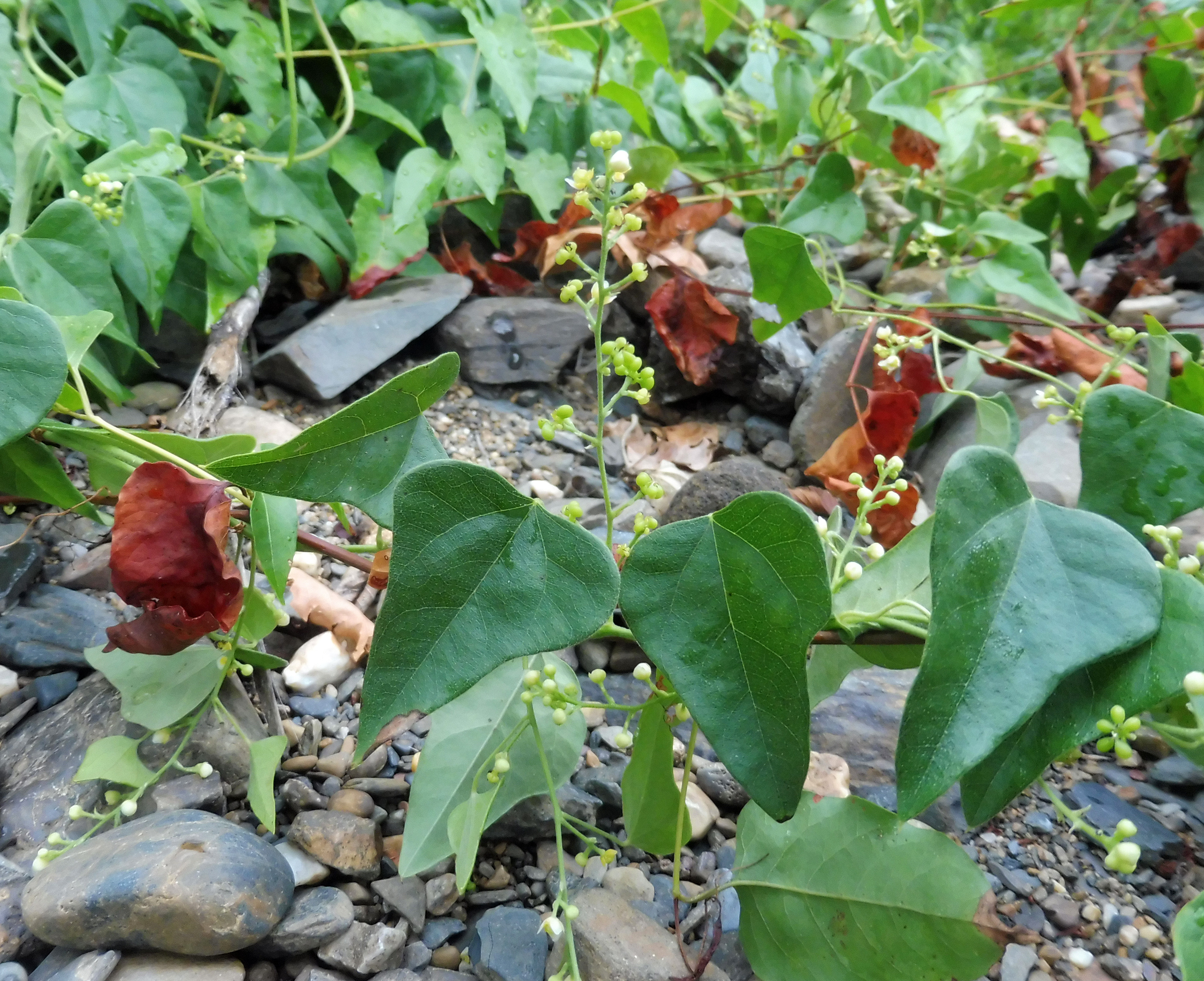
N. carolina with early flowers

== Distribution ==
This species is native from northern Florida to Mexico, north to North Carolina, Kentucky, southern Illinois and southeast Kansas. Its natural habitat is in rocky woodlands and streamside thickets, particularly in calcareous areas. It is a weedy species, and can also be found in disturbed habitats such as fencerows and waste areas.

== Cultivation ==
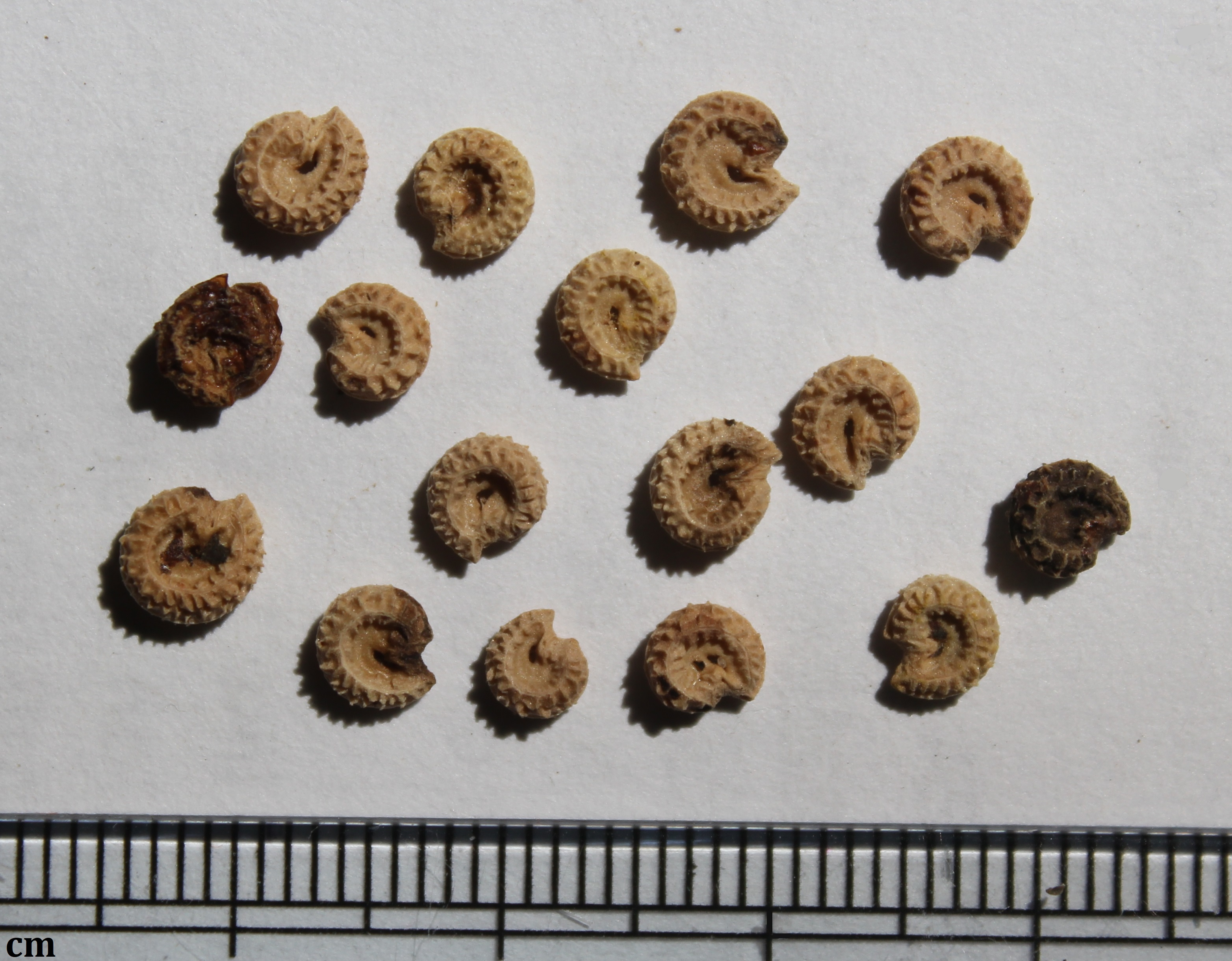
Seeds

The flowers are small and plentiful. At a young age Carolina coralbead appear greenish. The seeds need cold stratification of three months. Seeds germinate in 21 to 30 days at 68 °F. The plant blooms in late spring and the fruits, abundant bright red berries, are mature by late summer. Admiring its scarlet fruits, landscapers sometimes allow it to grow on trellises, fences or let it naturally spread among other weeds and shrubs.

This plant can be fast-growing and difficult to eradicate.

== Chemical components ==
Through photochemical analysis using spectral and mixed-melting comparison, the stems and leaves of Nephroia carolina were found to contain the following compounds: two cyclitols, (+)quercitol and (−)viburnitol; a lactone, loliolide; and three alkaloids, sinoacutine, magnoflorine, and palmatine.

== Legend ==
The common name for this plant in East Texas is Margil's Vine, referencing a legend involving Antonio Margil OFM, the Spanish Franciscan missionary active throughout Texas in the early 18th century.
