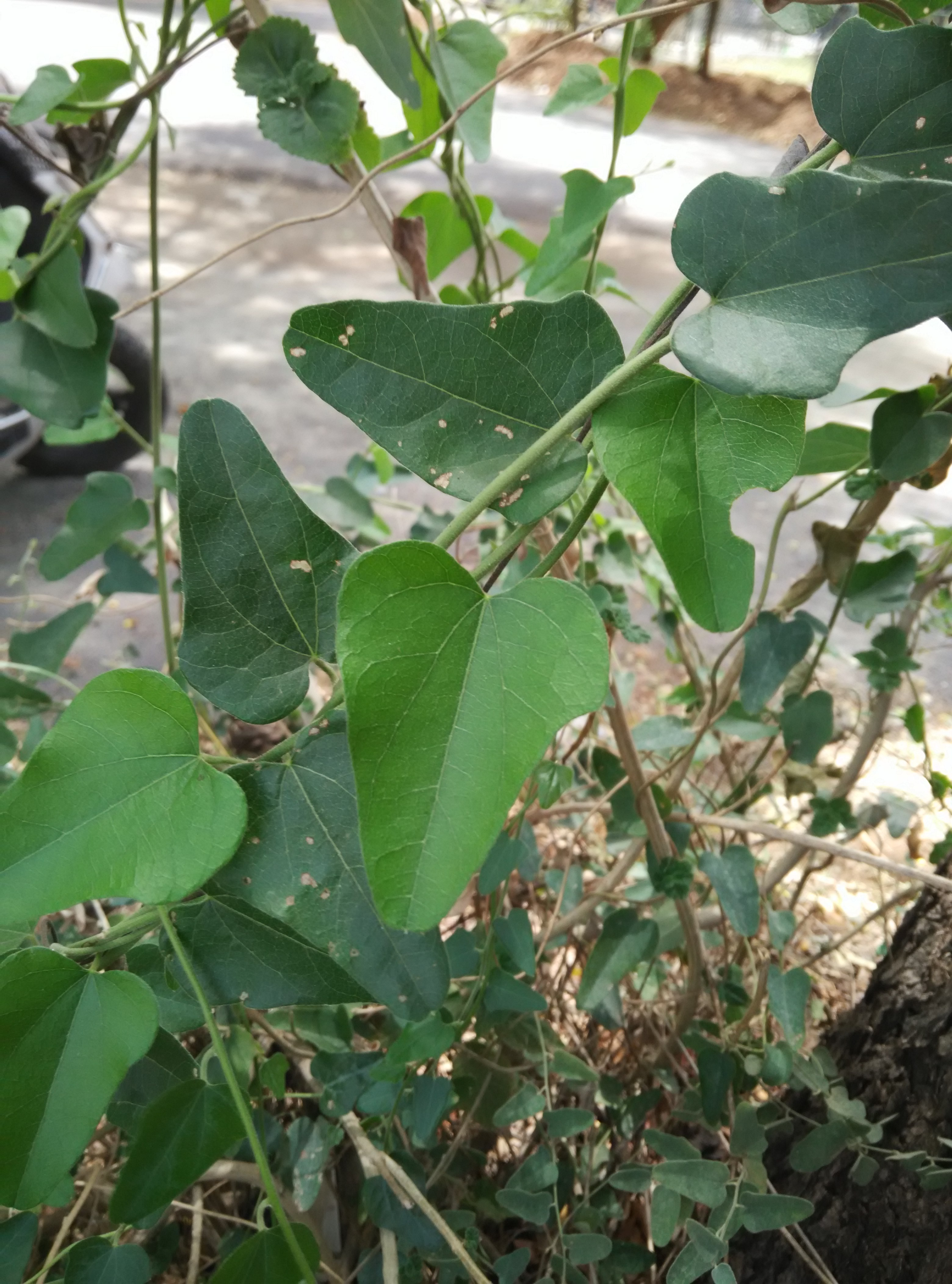
- Broom creeper in Pune

Scientific classification
- Kingdom: Plantae
- Clade: Tracheophytes
- Clade: Angiosperms
- Clade: Eudicots
- Order: Ranunculales
- Family: Menispermaceae
- Genus: Cocculus
- Species: C. hirsutus

Binomial name
- Cocculus hirsutus (L.) W.Theob. (1860)

Synonyms
- Synonymy: Cebatha hirsuta (L.) Kuntze (1891); Cebatha villosa C.Chr. (1922), nom. superfl.; Cocculus villosus DC. (1817), nom. superfl.; Convolvulus gangeticus L. (1756); Evolvulus gangeticus (L.) L. (1762); Holopeira villosa Miers (1867), nom. superfl.; Limacia villosa W.Theob. (1883), nom. superfl.; Menispermum hirsutum L. (1753); Menispermum villosum Lam. (1797), nom. superfl.; Merremia gangetica (L.) Cufod. (1969); Cocculus aristolochiae DC. (1817); Cocculus hastatus DC. (1817); Cocculus holopeira-torrida Broun & R.L.Massey (1929); Cocculus linnaeanus Kurz (1874); Cocculus sepium Colebr. (1821); Cocculus villosus var. glabratus Schweinf. (1896); Holopeira auriculata Miers (1867); Holopeira laeviuscula Miers (1867); Holopeira torrida Miers (1867); Menispermum hastatum Lam. (1797); Menispermum myosotis L. (1759), orth. var.; Menispermum myosotoides L. (1753); Menispermum myosuroides Hill (1770), orth. var.

= Cocculus hirsutus =

Species of flowering plant

Cocculus hirsutus is a tropical flowering plant with the common name broom creeper or Patalgarudi (Sanskrit). It is native to South Asia, Southeast Asia, parts of East Asia, West Asia and tropical Africa. It is a vine climbing up to 3 metres (9.8 ft), with white to yellowish flowers and dark purple fruits 4 to 8 mm in diameter.
