= 5-Deoxyinositol =

- Chemical structure of 5-deoxyinositol

Names
- Preferred IUPAC name (1R,2S,4S,5R)-Cyclohexane-1,2,3,4,5-pentol
- Other names Viburnitol; d-Quercitol; (+)-Quercitol; Proto-quercitol; Acorn sugar

Identifiers
CAS Number	488-73-3
3D model (JSmol)	Interactive image
ChemSpider	390170
PubChem CID	441437
UNII	M8H1D7SDLM
CompTox Dashboard (EPA)	DTXSID80197609
- InChI: InChI=1S/C6H12O5/c7-2-1-3(8)5(10)6(11)4(2)9/h2-11H,1H2/t2-,3-,4+,5+/m1/s1 Key: IMPKVMRTXBRHRB-MBMOQRBOSA-N; InChI=1/C6H12O5/c7-2-1-3(8)5(10)6(11)4(2)9/h2-11H,1H2/t2-,3-,4+,5+/m1/s1 Key: IMPKVMRTXBRHRB-MBMOQRBOBL
- SMILES: O[C@@H]1C[C@@H](O)[C@H](O)C(O)[C@H]1O

Properties
Chemical formula	C_{6}H_{12}O_{5}
Molar mass	164.157 g·mol^{−1}
Appearance	Crystalline solid
Melting point	234 to 235 °C (453 to 455 °F; 507 to 508 K)
Solubility in water	Soluble
- Except where otherwise noted, data are given for materials in their standard state (at 25 °C [77 °F], 100 kPa). verify (what is ?) Infobox references

5-Deoxyinositol (quercitol) is a cyclitol. It can be found in wines aged in oak wood barrels. It can also be found in Quercus sp. (oaks) and in Gymnema sylvestre. It is different from quercetol, a synonym of quercetin.

== Biosynthesis ==
The proposed biosynthesis of 5-deoxyinositol begins with the conversion of D-glucose to myo-inositol. In this pathway, D-glucose is phosphorylated to form D-glucose-6-phosphate. The NAD+ dependent enzyme inositol 1-phosphate synthase (I1PS) then catalyzes the subsequent oxidation, enolization, aldol cyclization, and reduction of D-glucose 6-phosphate to form myo-inositol 1-phosphate. Hydrolysis of the phosphate group on this molecule gives myo-inositol. Myo-inositol can then be converted into 5-deoxyinositol in three steps, beginning with the oxidation of myo-inositol by inositol dehydrogenase (ID) to form scyllo-inosose. This intermediate is then dehydrated to form a diketone. The reduction of this diketone gives 5-deoxyinositol. This final reduction is thought to be catalyzed by one or more unidentified reductases or dehydrogenases.

Biosynthesis of 5-deoxyinositol
