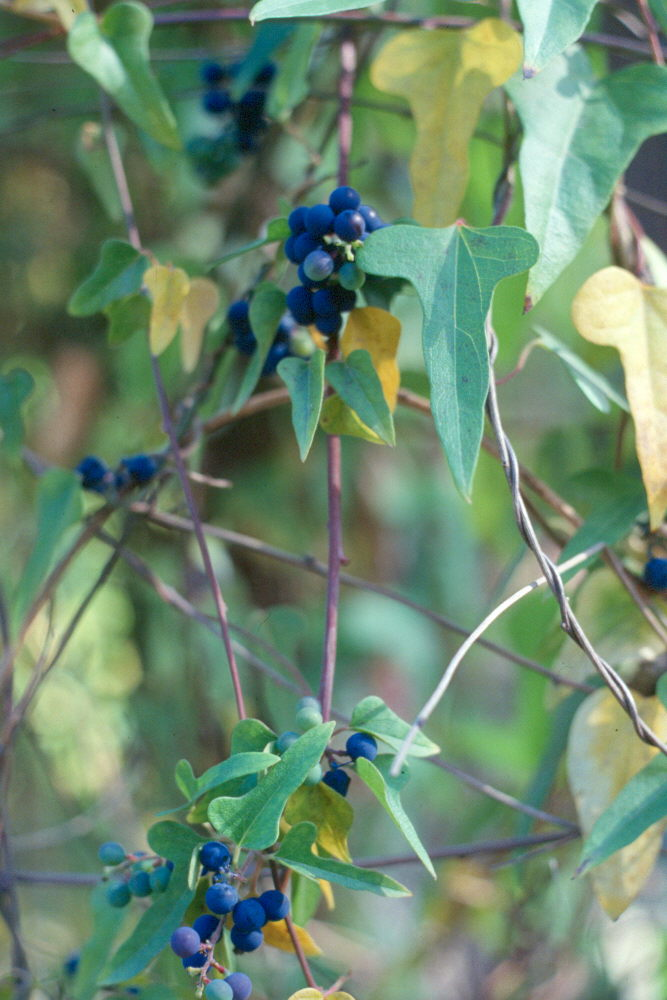

Scientific classification
- Kingdom: Plantae
- Clade: Tracheophytes
- Clade: Angiosperms
- Clade: Eudicots
- Order: Ranunculales
- Family: Menispermaceae
- Genus: Nephroia
- Species: N. orbiculata

Binomial name
- Nephroia orbiculata (L.) L.Lian & Wei Wang

Synonyms
- Menispermum orbiculatum L., 1753; Cebatha orbiculata (L.) Kuntze, 1891; Cocculus orbiculatus (L.) C.K.Schneid., 1906; Menispermum ovalifolium Vahl ex Pers., 1807; Menispermum hexagynum Roxb., 1814; Cocculus triflorus DC., 1817; Cocculus hexagynus Colebr., 1821; Menispermum triflorum (DC.) Spreng., 1825; Cocculus ovalifolius Blume, 1825; Menispermum ovalifolium (Blume) Spreng., 1827; Cocculus ferrandianus Gaudich., 1830; Ferrandia oleifera Gaudich., 1830; Cocculus diantherus Hook. & Arn., 1841 [1833]; Cocculus cynanchoides C.Presl, 1835; Menispermum hexagynum (Colebr.) Roxb., 1832; Cocculus umbellatus Steud., 1840; Nephroia dianthera (Hook. & Arn.) Miers, 1851; ?Cocculus dichopetalus Turcz., 1854; Hypserpa triflora (DC.) Miers, 1864; Nephroia hexagyna (Colebr.) Miers, 1867; Nephroia ovalifolia (Vahl ex Pers.) Miers, 1851; Nephroia cynanchoides (C.Presl) Miers, 1851; Nephroia ferrandiana (Gaudich.) Miers, 1851; Nephroia caudata Miers, 1867; Holopeira lonchophylla Miers, 1867; Holopeira fecunda Miers, 1867; Cocculus integer Hillebr., 1888; Cocculus lonchophyllus (Miers) Hillebr., 1888; Cocculus virgatus Hillebr., 1888; Limacia kunstleri King, 1889; Cebatha ferrandiana (Gaudich.) Kuntze, 1891; Cebatha integra (Hillebr.) Kuntze, 1891; Cebatha lonchophylla (Miers) Kuntze, 1891; Cebatha virgata (Hillebr.) Kuntze, 1891; Nephroia elegans Ridl., 1910; Cocculus elegans (Ridl.) Ridl., 1922

= Nephroia orbiculata =

Species of flowering plant

Nephroia orbiculata, the queen coralbead, is a species of woody vines. It is found from India east to Java.
