= Ruscinian =

The Ruscian age is a period of geologic time (5.3–3.4 Ma) within the Pliocene used more specifically with European Land Mammal Ages. It precedes the Villanyian age and follows the Turolian age. The Ruscian overlaps the early Piacenzian and Zanclean ages.
