= Astaracian =

Period of geologic time equivalent with the Middle Miocene

The Astaracian age is a period of geologic time (16 to 11.6 Ma), equivalent with the Middle Miocene and used more specifically with European Land Mammal Ages. It precedes the Vallesian age and follows the Orleanian age. The Astaracian overlaps the Langhian and Serravallian ages.

During the Late Orleanian and Astaracian (17 to 10.7 Ma), oscillating sea levels resulted in a succession of palaeogeographic changes in the Eastern Mediterranean; the opening and closing of the Tethys seaway resulted in temporary land-bridges between Africa and Eurasia. Three short periods of faunal migrations between the continents can be distinguished:

During the Late Orleanian, MN 5 (17 to 15 Ma), a first wave of migrations from Africa correspond to fossil fauna from Greece. The Antonios locality (MN 4/5, 17 Ma) on the Chalkidiki peninsula includes the small tragulid Dorcatherium, the giraffid Palaeomeryx, and the suiform Sanitheres. The Thymiana locality (MN 5, 15.5 Ma) on Chios includes both the giraffid Georgiomeryx, Dorcatherium, the ctenodactylid Sayimys as well as an immigrant from Asia, the proboscidean Choerolophodon known from the Bugti fauna (MN 3, 18.3 Ma) in India. Primates also arrived during MN5: Pliopithecus is known from Elgg in Switzerland and Pontlevoy-Thenay in France and prevailed until the end of the Vallesian.

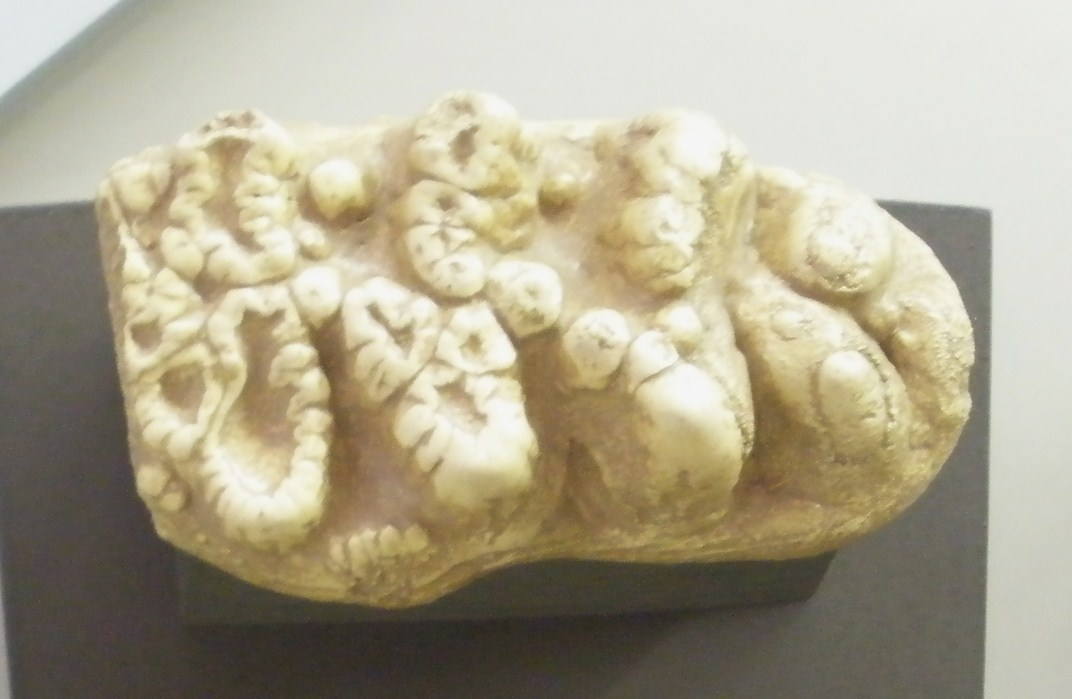
Choerolophodon molar

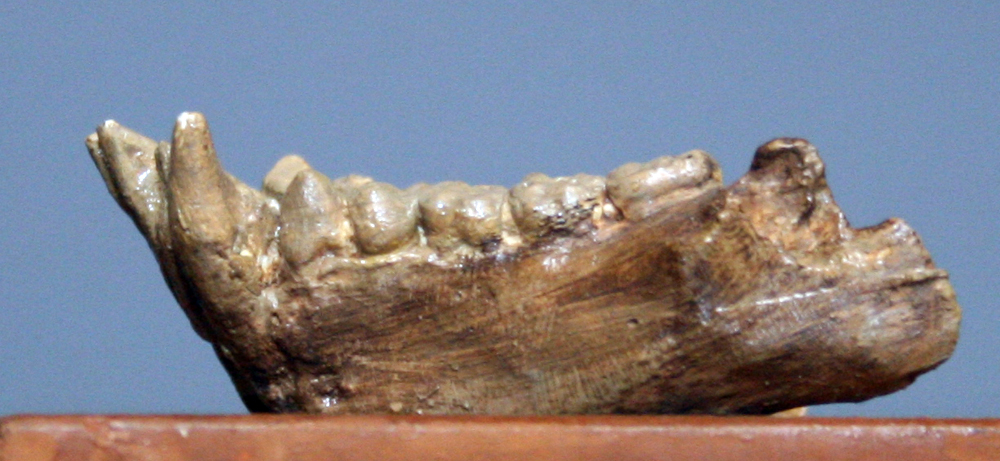
Pliopithecus antiquus

A second wave from Africa in the Early Astaracian, MN 6 (15 to 13.5 Ma), included the hominoid Griphopithecus; a Eurasian relative to the African Kenyapithecus found at the Pasalar and Candir localities in Turkey. and at Neudorf-Sandberg in Slovakia. The primate genus was accompanied by the aardvark Orycteropus. From Asia came the hyracoid Pliohyrax, the cervid Dicrocerus, and the suid Listriodon. Asian bovids such as Protragocerus, Tethytragus, and Hypsodontus known from Asia Minor and Chios during MN 5 migrated into Africa as part of this wave.

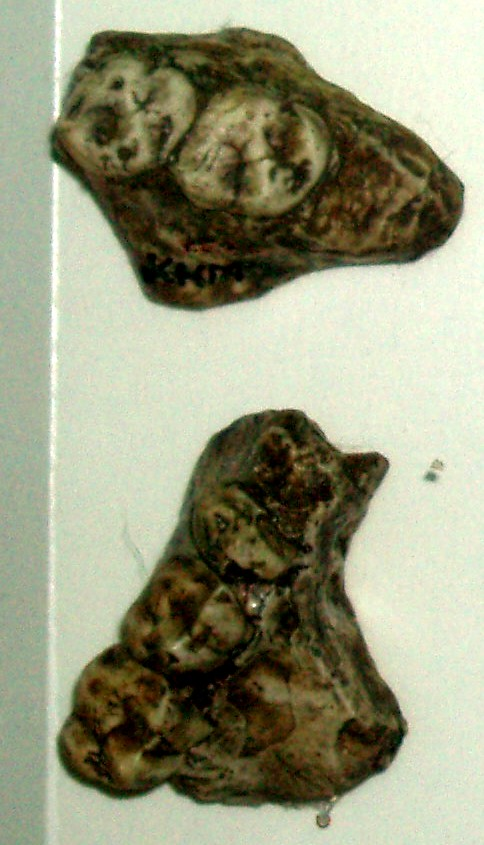
Kenyapithecus

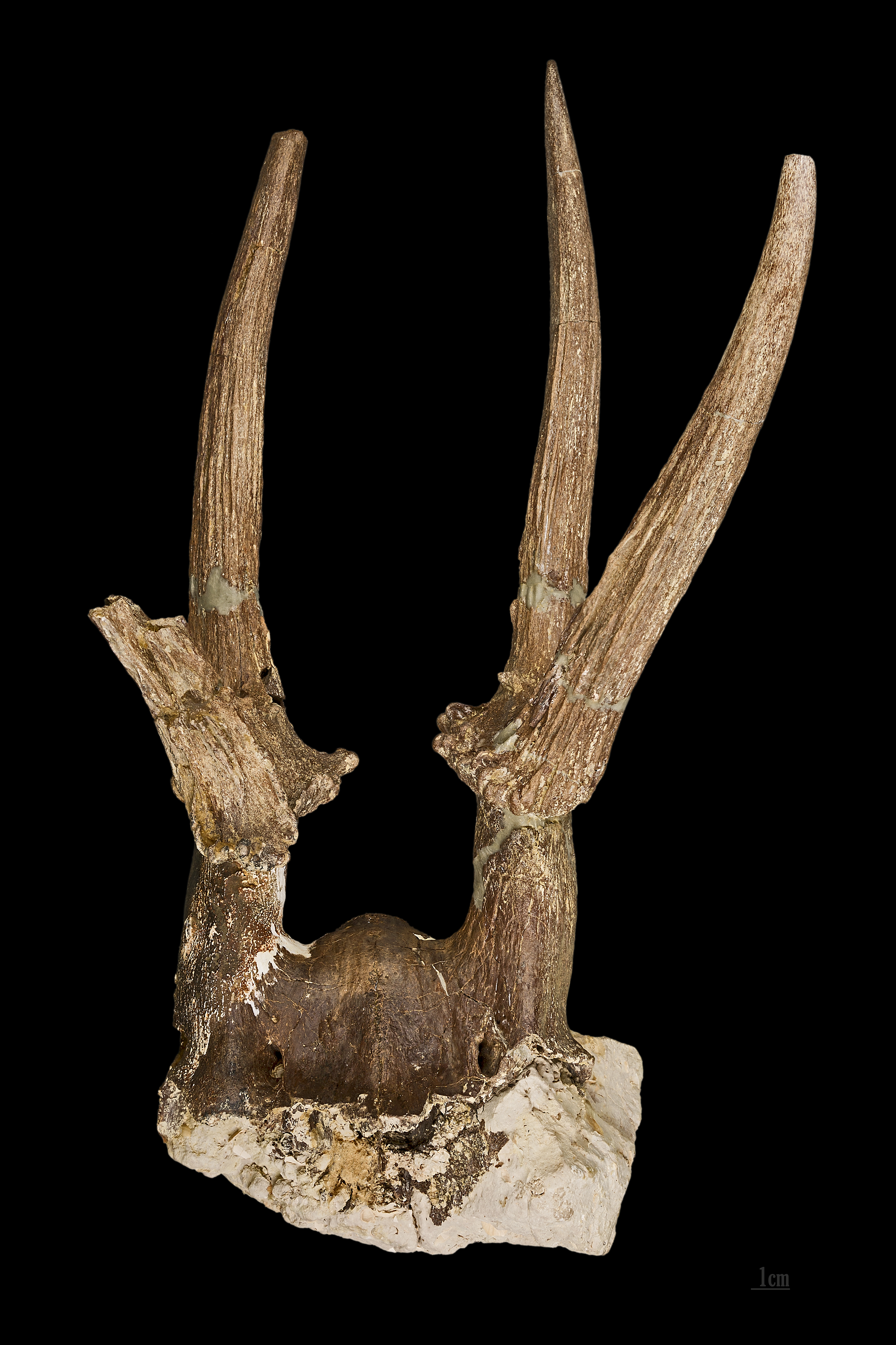
Dicrocerus elegans

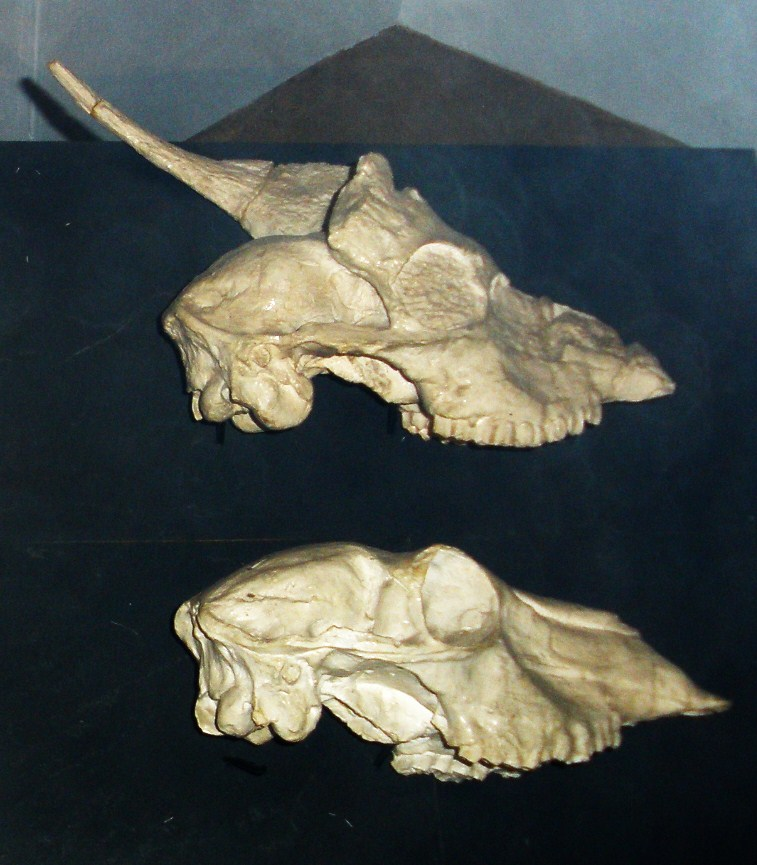
Protragocerus labidotus

A third wave during MN 7/8 (13.5 to 10.7 Ma) probably took place, but the late Astaracian is poorly documented. A seaway most likely joined the Paratethys and the Mediterranean, preventing migrations. The hominoid Dryopithecus appeared in Europe 12.5 Ma together with the Asian suid Propotamochoerus. The rodent genus Cricetulodon is known from Western and Central Europe from MN 3 and from the end of MN 7/8 in Turkey and Greece.

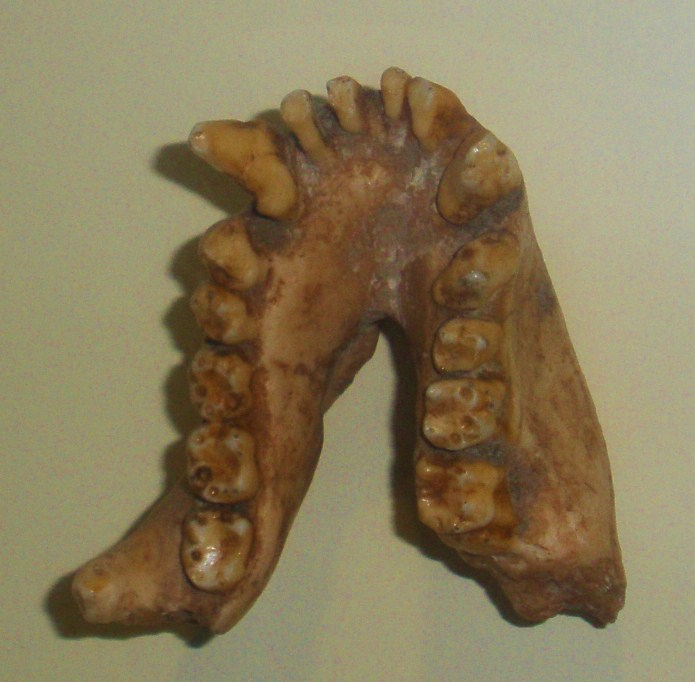
Dryopithecus fontani mandible

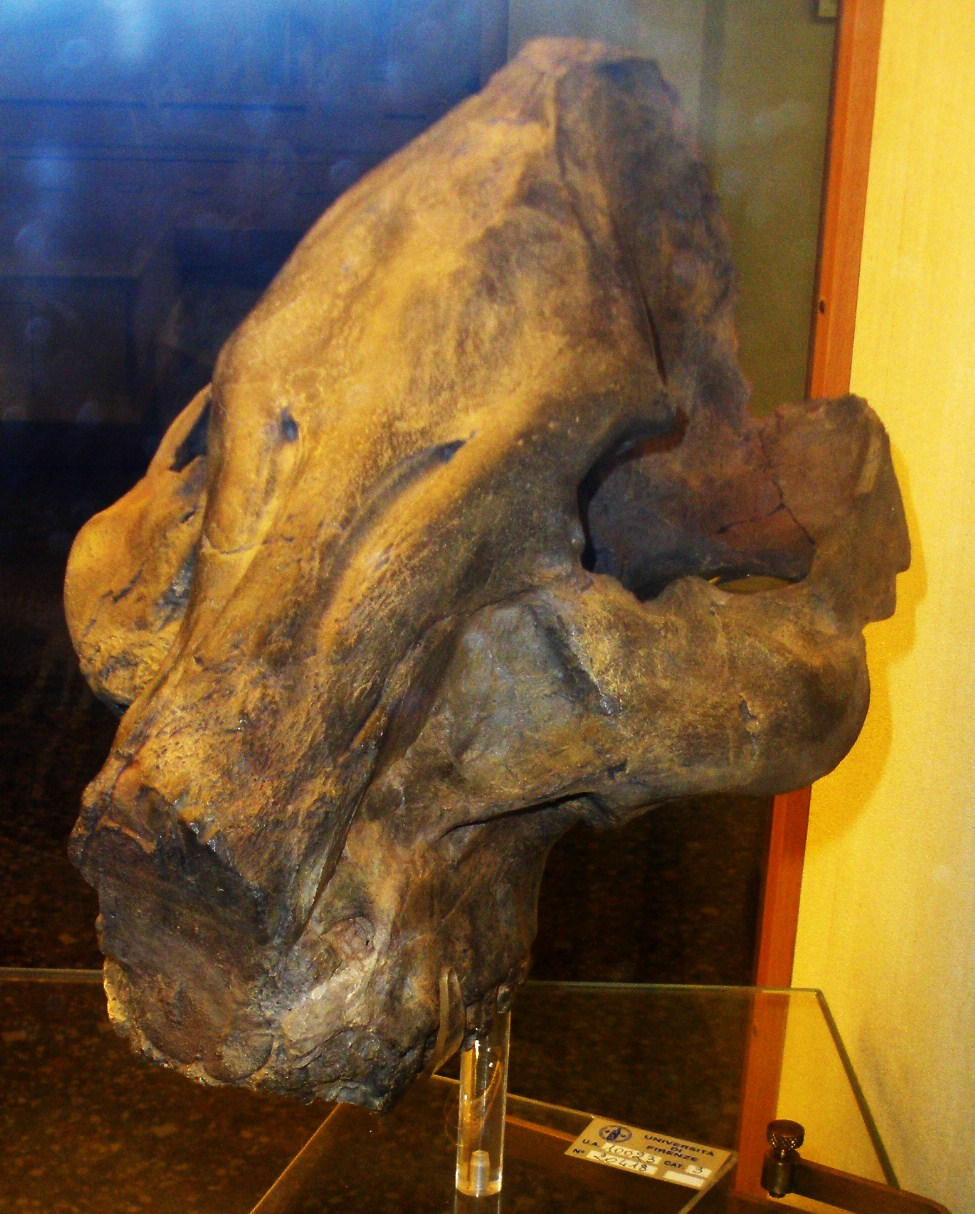
Propotamochoerus giganteus
