= European land mammal age =

Rock layers based on occurrences of fossil assemblages of European land mammals

Cenozoic periods
An approximate timescale of key Cenozoic events Vertical axis scale: Millions of years ago

The European Land Mammal Mega Zones (abbreviation: ELMMZ, more commonly known as European land mammal ages or ELMA) are zones in rock layers that have a specific assemblage of fossils (biozones) based on occurrences of fossil assemblages of European land mammals. These biozones cover most of the Cenozoic, with particular focus having been paid to the Neogene and Paleogene systems (i.e. rock layers which are 65.5 to 2.588 million years old), the Quaternary has several competing systems. In cases when fossils of mammals are abundant, stratigraphers and paleontologists can use these biozones as a more practical regional alternative to the stages of the official ICS geologic timescale. European Land Mammal Mega Zones are often also confusingly referred to as ages, stages, or intervals.

== Biostratigraphic methods ==
Mammal zones were, like all biozones, established using geographic place names where fossil materials were obtained. The basic unit of measure is the first/last boundary statement. This shows that the first appearance event of one taxon is known to predate the last appearance event of another. If two taxa are found in the same fossil quarry or at the same stratigraphic horizon, then their age-range zones overlap.

The terrestrial stratigraphy of the Cenozoic is more difficult than that of marine deposits. The geologic timescale of the ICS is therefore based on marine fossils, that don't occur in terrestrial sediments. This makes the correlation of terrestrial deposits with the ICS timescale often difficult. Correlation is possible when marine deposits interfinger with terrestrial deposits (resulting from a series of transgressions and regressions of the sea during deposition), but this isn't the case everywhere. A fine stratigraphic division of the terrestrial record can in most places only be made using fossils of land species. Small mammals are often the best choice as they are quite abundant in the terrestrial record, especially their teeth. Teeth have an even better chance of preservation than bones.

The European mammalian biozones were established for the Paleogene (66-23.03 Mya, 8 zones) and Neogene (23.03-2.58 Mya, 7 zones) separately. Some of these, especially for the Neogene, were already established in the 19th century. The Villafranchian was, for example, introduced by Lorenzo Pareto in 1865. A finer subdivision was established by Pierre Mein in 1975, who divided the Neogene in 17 zones, known as the MN zonation, indicated by the letters MN (Mammal Neogene) and a number.

Similarly, a more detailed subdivision for the Paleogene period was established. There are 30 such Mammal Paleogene zones (MP1 to MP30, numbered from old to young).

== Paleogene European mammal zones ==
Epoch	ICS age	ELMMZ	Age (Ma)
Miocene	Aquitanian	Agenian	younger
Oligocene	Chattian	Arvernian	23.03–29.2
Oligocene	Rupelian	Arvernian	23.03–29.2
Oligocene	Rupelian	Suevian	29.2–33.8
Oligocene	Rupelian	Headonian	33.8–37.2
Eocene	Priabonian	Headonian	33.8–37.2
Eocene	Bartonian	Robiacian	37.2–42.7
Eocene	Lutetian	Robiacian	37.2–42.7
Eocene	Lutetian	Geiseltalian	42.7–48.5
Eocene	Lutetian	Grauvian	48.5–50.8
Eocene	Ypresian	Grauvian	48.5–50.8
Eocene	Ypresian	Neustrian	50.8–55.0
Paleocene	Thanetian	Neustrian	50.8–55.0
Paleocene	Thanetian	Cernaysian	55.0–55.9
Subdivision of the Paleogene period into European Land Mammal Mega Zones (ELMMZ).

There are 30 Mammal Paleogene zones covering the Paleogene (66-23.03 Mya).

== Neogene European mammal zones ==
Neogene ELMMZ

European Land Mammal Mega Zones most often have their bases at first appearances (FAD, First Appearance Date) of a certain species or genus. The numbers are higher for younger zones. Due to a redefinition of the boundary between the Neogene and Quaternary periods, MN 17 is now in fact considered a Quaternary biozone.

Biozone	Small mammals	Large mammals
MN 17	Kislangia gusi, Mimomys tornensis, Mimomys pliocaenicus, Mimomys reidi	Eucladoceros
MN 16	Kislangia ischus, Mimomys polonicus, Kislangia cappettai, Mimomys hajnackensis	Equus (horse), Mammuthus (mammoth), Homotherium, Megantereon, Ursus etruscus, Pliohyaena perrieri, Gazellospira torticornis, Arvernoceros ardei, Hesperidoceras merlai, Cervus perrieri
MN 15	Mimomys occitanus, Oryctolagus, Mimomys vandemeuleni, Mimomys davakosi	Chasmaporthetes lunensis
MN 14	Promimomys, Trilophomys, Celadensia, Castor (beaver)	Sus arvernensis, Croizetoceros, Acinonyx, Lynx issiodorensis
MN 13	Paraethomys, Rhagapodemnus, Stephanomys, Apodemus, Apocricetus	Parabos, Paracamelus, Agriotherium, Apocricetus, Nyctereutes, Hexaprotodon
MN 12	Parapodemus barbarae, Huerzelerimys turoliensis	Pliocervus, Hispanodorcas, Palaeoryx, Occitanomys adroveri, Procapreolus
MN 11	Parapodemus lugdunensis, Huerzelerimys vireti, Occitanomys sondaari	Birgerbohlinia, Lucentia
MN 10	Rotundomys, Pliopetaurista, Schreuderia, Progonomys cathalai	Hyaenictis almerai, Adcrocuta eximia, Microstonyx major, Tragoportax gaufryi
MN 9	Cricetulodon	Hippotherium, Decennatherium, Machairodus
MN 7/8	Megacricetodon ibericus, Megacricetodon gregarius	Parachleuastochoerus, Propotamochoerus, Palaeotragus, Protragocerus, Tetralophodon
MN 6	Megacricetodon crusafonti, Megacricetodon gersi	Tethytragus, Hispanomeryx, Euprox, Listriodon
MN 5	Megacricetodon collongensis	Miotragocerus, Micromeryx, Heteroprox, Hispanotherium
MN 4	Megacricetodon primitivus	Bunolistriodon, Dorcatherium, Chalicotherium, Eotragus, Prodeinotherium
MN 3		Gomphotherium, Procervulus, Lagomeryx, Actoocemas, Palaeomeryx, Brachyodus, Anchitherium, Aureliachoerus, Hemicyon
MN 2	Ligerimys, Prolagus, Lagopsis, Ritterneria manca	Teruelia, Lorancameryx, Oriomeryx, Pseudaelurus, Xenohyus, Andegameryx, Amphitragulus
MN 1	Rhodanomys schlosseri, Vasseuromys	Hyotherium

== Quaternary European mammal zones ==
The first zonation for the Quaternary of Europe was proposed by Azzaroli in 1967. This was then expanded by Gliozzi et al. in 1997 to make a system of 3 'ages' subdivided into 13 'faunal units'. The scheme does not define boundaries but instead is accompanied by a range chart, where the entry and exit dates for the taxa are indicated. Each zone is named after a reference locality. Most of the reference locations are in Italy but the scheme is used in other European regions. The mammal ages and Faunal Units (FU) after Gliozzi et al. are:

Mammal Ages after Gliozzi et al., 1997
Mammal Age	Faunal Unit	sub-age	Large Mammals
Villafranchian (Middle Pliocene to Early Pleistocene)	Triversa	Early Villafranchian	Pliorhinus megarhinus, Sus minor, Alephis liryx, Felsinotherium gervaisi
Villafranchian (Middle Pliocene to Early Pleistocene)	Montopoli	Early Villafranchian	Mammuthus gromovi, Equus lioenzwensi, Stephanorhinus etruscus
Villafranchian (Middle Pliocene to Early Pleistocene)	Costa S. Giacomo	Middle Villafranchian	Canis, Sus strozzi, Leptobos furtivus, Hystrix refossa, Gazellospira torticomis, Anancus arvernensis
Villafranchian (Middle Pliocene to Early Pleistocene)	Olivola	Late Villafranchian	Pachycrocuta brevirostris, Panthera gombaszoegensis, Procamptoceras brivatense, Eucladoceros dicranios, Eucladoceros nestii, Pseudodama, Canis etruscus
Villafranchian (Middle Pliocene to Early Pleistocene)	Tasso	Late Villafranchian	Hippopotamus antiquus, Praevibos, Leptobos vallisarni, Equus stehlini, Canis arnensis, Canis falconeri
Villafranchian (Middle Pliocene to Early Pleistocene)	Farnetta	Late Villafranchian	Leptobos vallisarni, Eucladoceros dicranios, Eucladoceros nestii, Praemegaceros obscurus, Microtus
Villafranchian (Middle Pliocene to Early Pleistocene)	Piro Nord	Late Villafranchian	Bison, Praemegaceros solilhacus
Galerian (Middle Pleistocene)	Colle Curti	Early Galerian	Equus altidens, Equus bressanus, Equus sussenbornensis, Praemegaceros verticornis
Galerian (Middle Pleistocene)	Silvia	Middle Galerian	Cervus elaphus acoronatus
Galerian (Middle Pleistocene)	Isernia	Middle Galerian	Panthera fossilis, Palaeoloxodon antiquus, Mammuthus trogontherii, Stephanorhinus hundsheimensis, Megaloceros savini, Bos, Bison schoetensacki, Equus caballus, Pseudodama
Galerian (Middle Pleistocene)	Fontana Ranuccio	Late Galerian	Homotherium latidens, Cervus elaphus eostephanoceros, Dama clactoniana, Equus altidens, Equus sussenbornensis
Aurelian (late Middle Pleistocene to Late Pleistocene)	Torre in Pietra	Early Aurelian	Canis lupus, Ursus spelaeus, Megaloceros giganteus, Cervus elaphus rianensis
Aurelian (late Middle Pleistocene to Late Pleistocene)	Vitinia	Middle Aurelian	Dama dama tiberina, Equus hydruntinus
Aurelian (late Middle Pleistocene to Late Pleistocene)	none designated	Late Aurelian	Dama dama dama, Capra ibex, Coelodonta antiquitatis, Mammuthus primigenius

In 1982, Guérin proposed an alternative scheme, which extended the MN zonation scheme for the Neogene with additional units to cover the Quaternary. There have been further updates since. The MNQ (Mammal Neogene Quaternary) scheme added an additional 12 units in total, MNQ 16–27.

For small mammals there is a third scheme, the MmQ, published by Agustí, Moyà‐Solà, and Pons‐Moyà in 1987. The scheme includes some large mammals for reference and thus has a wider application.

== Other continental mammalian biozones ==
- Asian land mammal age
- Mammal Paleogene zone
- North American land mammal age
- South American land mammal age
- African land mammal age
