= Villanyian =

Villanyian age is a period of geologic time (3.4–1.8 Ma) within the Pliocene used more specifically with European Land Mammal Ages. It precedes the Ruscinian age and overlaps the early Piacenzian and Zanclean ages.
