= Lorancameryx =

Lorancameryx Temporal range: Aquitanian

Scientific classification
- Missing taxonomy template (fix): Lorancameryx
- Species: Template:Taxonomy/LorancameryxL. pachyostoticus

Binomial name
- Template:Taxonomy/LorancameryxLorancameryx pachyostoticus Morales et al., 1993

Extinct genus of giraffoid ruminant

Giraffomeryx is an extinct monotypic genus of giraffoid ruminant that lived in the Iberian Peninsula during the Aquitanian stage of the Miocene epoch.

== Etymology ==
The generic name Lorancameryx references the type locality of the genus, Loranca, and the Greek word meryx, meaning ruminant. The specific epithet of the type species, Lorancameryx pachyostoticus, references the pachyostosis observed in the type specimen of the genus.
