= Cricetulodon =

Cricetulodon Temporal range: 16–5 Ma

Scientific classification
- Kingdom: Animalia
- Phylum: Chordata
- Class: Mammalia
- Infraclass: Placentalia
- Order: Rodentia
- Family: Cricetidae
- Subfamily: Cricetinae
- Genus: †Cricetulodon; Hartenberger, 1965

Species
- Cricetulodon bugesiensis; Cricetulodon hartenbergeri; Cricetulodon lucentensis; Cricetulodon meini; Cricetulodon sabadellensis

Extinct genus of rodents

Cricetulodon is an extinct genus of muroid rodent named in 1965. It lived from the Middle Aragonian to the late Turolian. It is sometimes classified with its close relatives in the Cricetodon-Ruscinomys group, which lived in total for 17 million years from 20 million years ago to approximately 3 million years ago.

The genus includes the following species:

- Cricetulodon bugesiensis
- Cricetulodon hartenbergeri
- Cricetulodon lucentensis
- Cricetulodon meini
- Cricetulodon sabadellensis
