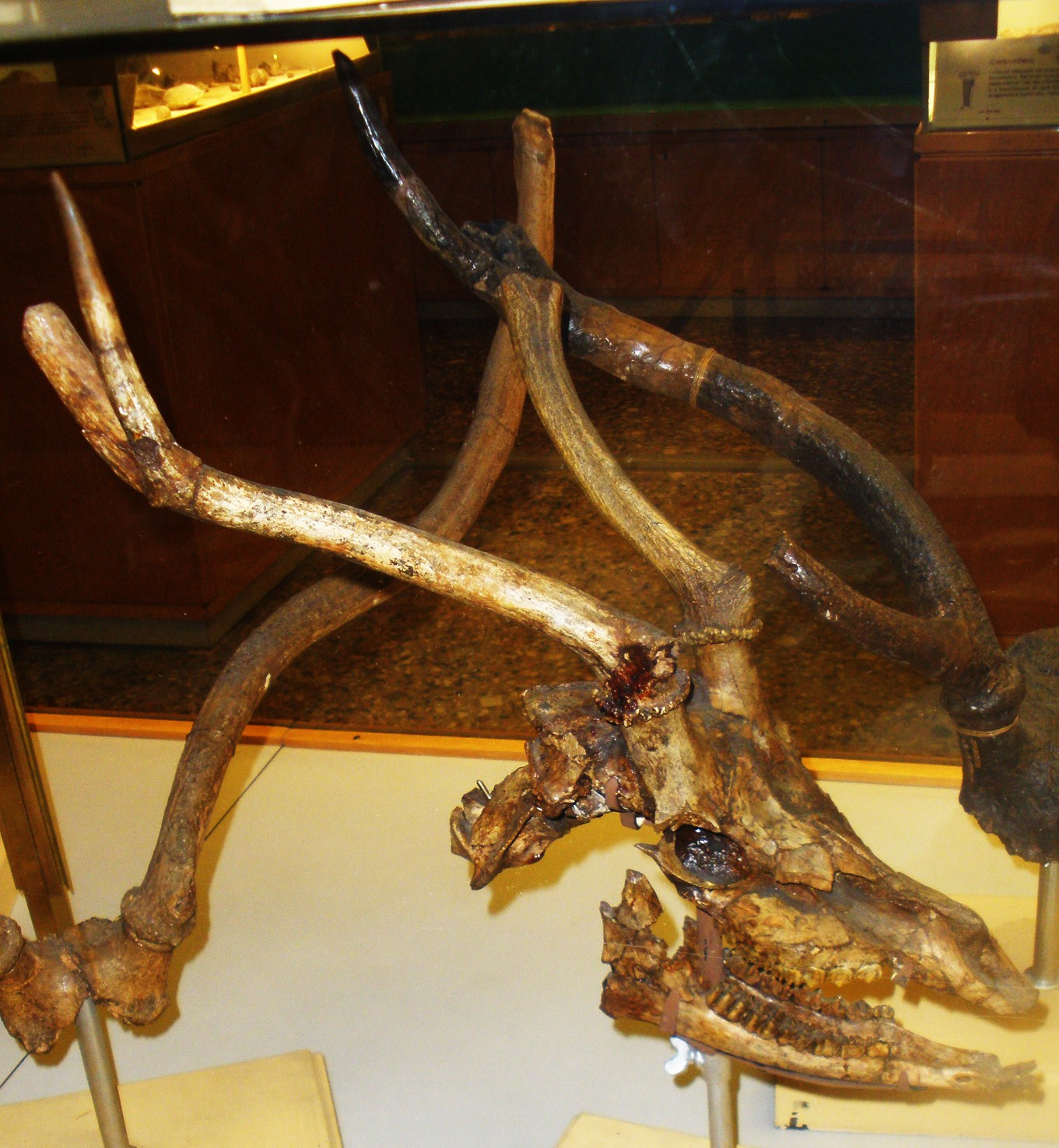
- Skull of P. nestii

Scientific classification
- Kingdom: Animalia
- Phylum: Chordata
- Class: Mammalia
- Order: Artiodactyla
- Family: Cervidae
- Tribe: Cervini
- Genus: †Pseudodama; Azzaroli,1992

= Pseudodama =

Pseudodama Temporal range: Late Pliocene–Early Pleistocene

Extinct genus of deer

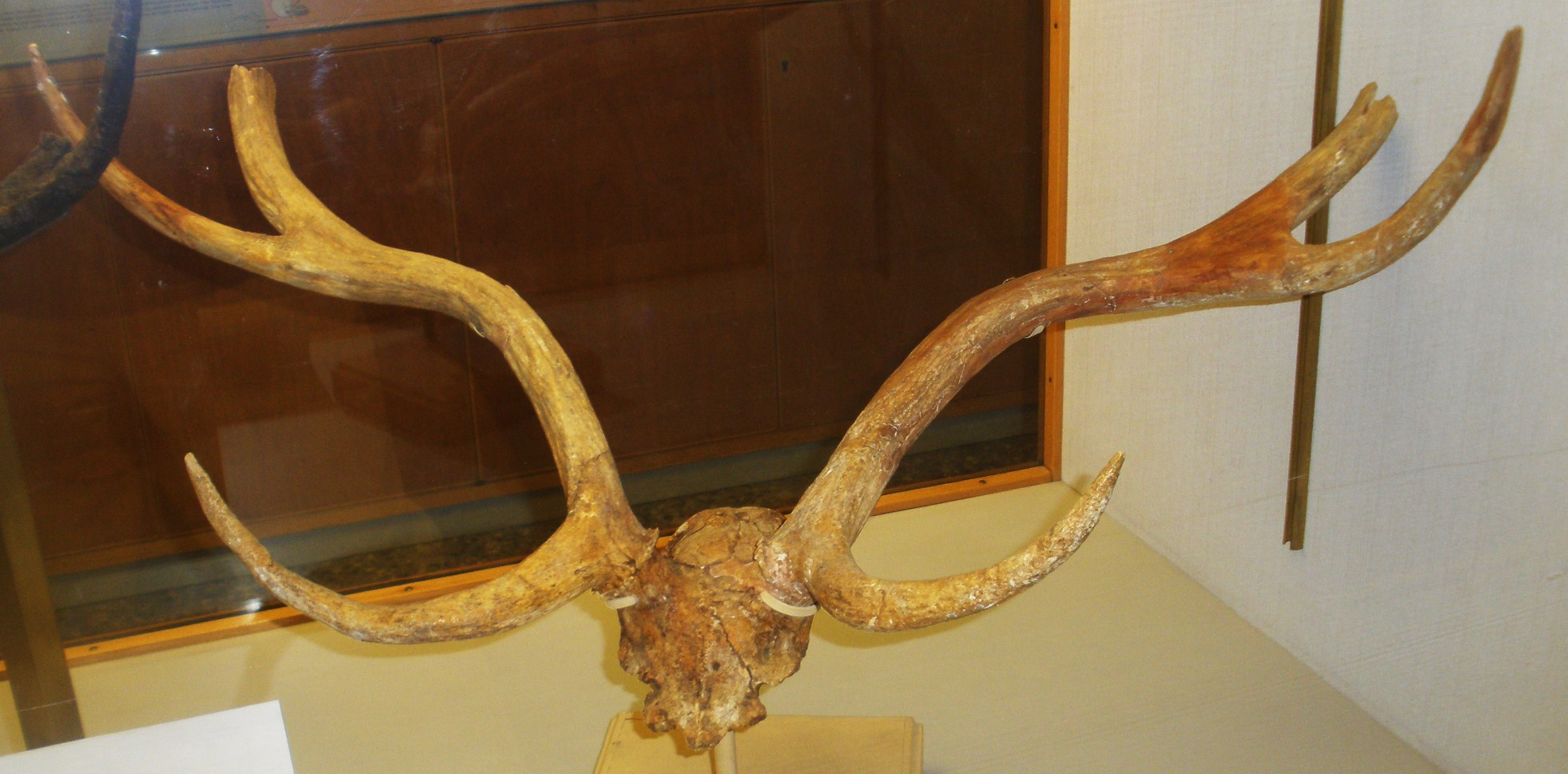
Antlers of P. farnetensis

Pseudodama is an extinct genus of deer found in Europe during the Late Pliocene to Early Pleistocene. It has been suggested by some authors to be ancestral to Dama, with some authors choosing to subsume its species into that genus.

== Palaeobiology ==
=== Diet ===
Dental microwear, a dietary proxy measuring the diet of an animal based on the last few days to weeks of its life, of Pseudodama vallonnetensis fossils fund at Quibas in Murcia, Spain indicates a highly grazing diet in this species, while its dental mesowear, a longer term proxy measuring diet over a longer span of the animal's lifetime, records a clear browsing diet. This indicates that the species was predominantly a browser for most of the year but seasonally shifted its diet to include grazing during parts of the year.
