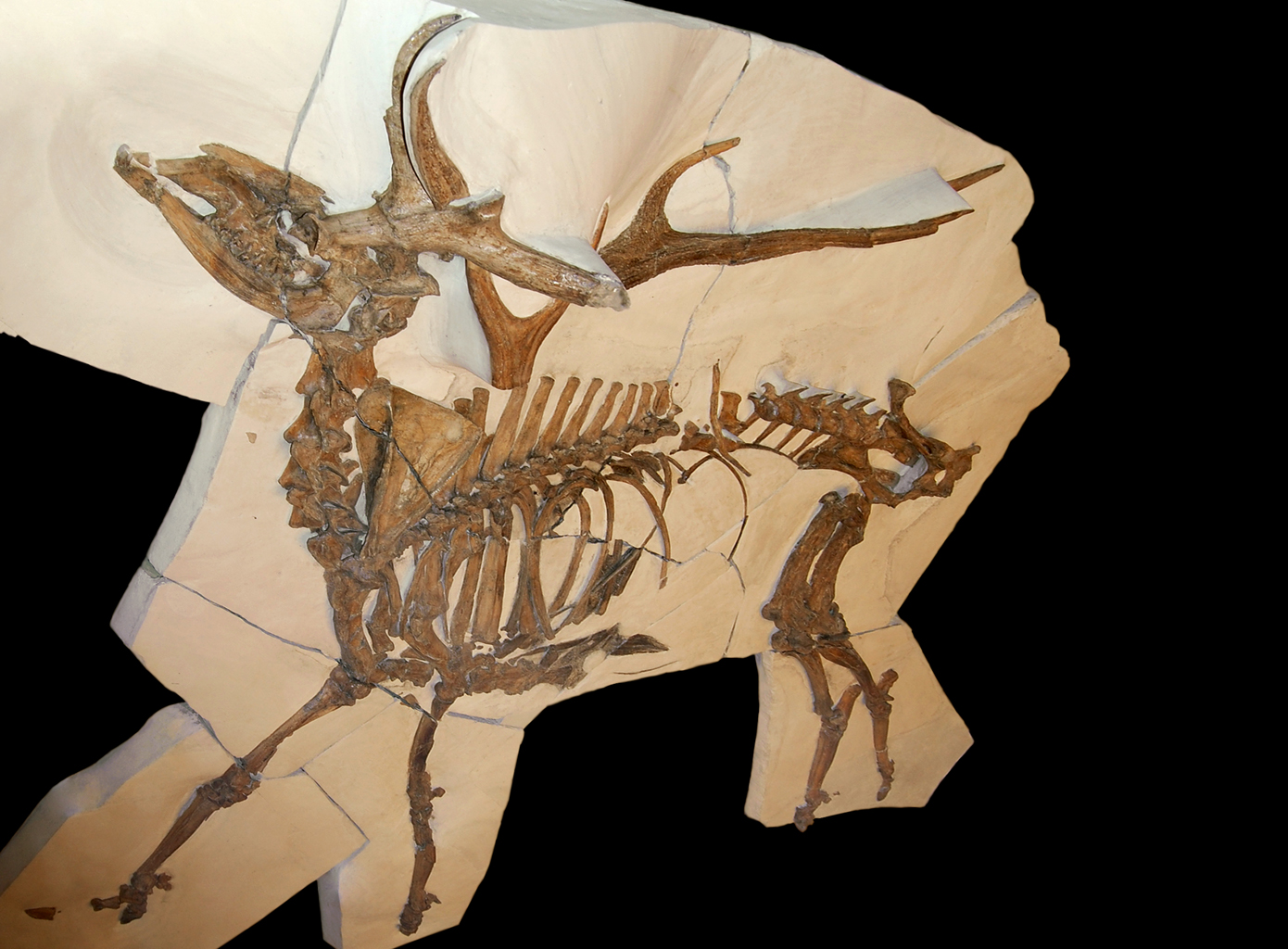
- Skeleton in anatomical connection of Cervus elaphus acoronatus discovered in Sovere, Bergamo

Scientific classification
- Domain: Eukaryota
- Kingdom: Animalia
- Phylum: Chordata
- Class: Mammalia
- Order: Artiodactyla
- Family: Cervidae
- Genus: Cervus
- Species: C. elaphus
- Subspecies: †C. e. acoronatus

Trinomial name
- †Cervus elaphus acoronatus (Beninde, 1937)

= Cervus elaphus acoronatus =

Extinct subspecies of deer

Cervus elaphus acoronatus is an extinct subspecies of the red deer belonging to the family Cervidae. Some authors consider it a distinct species, Cervus acoronatus.

== Description ==
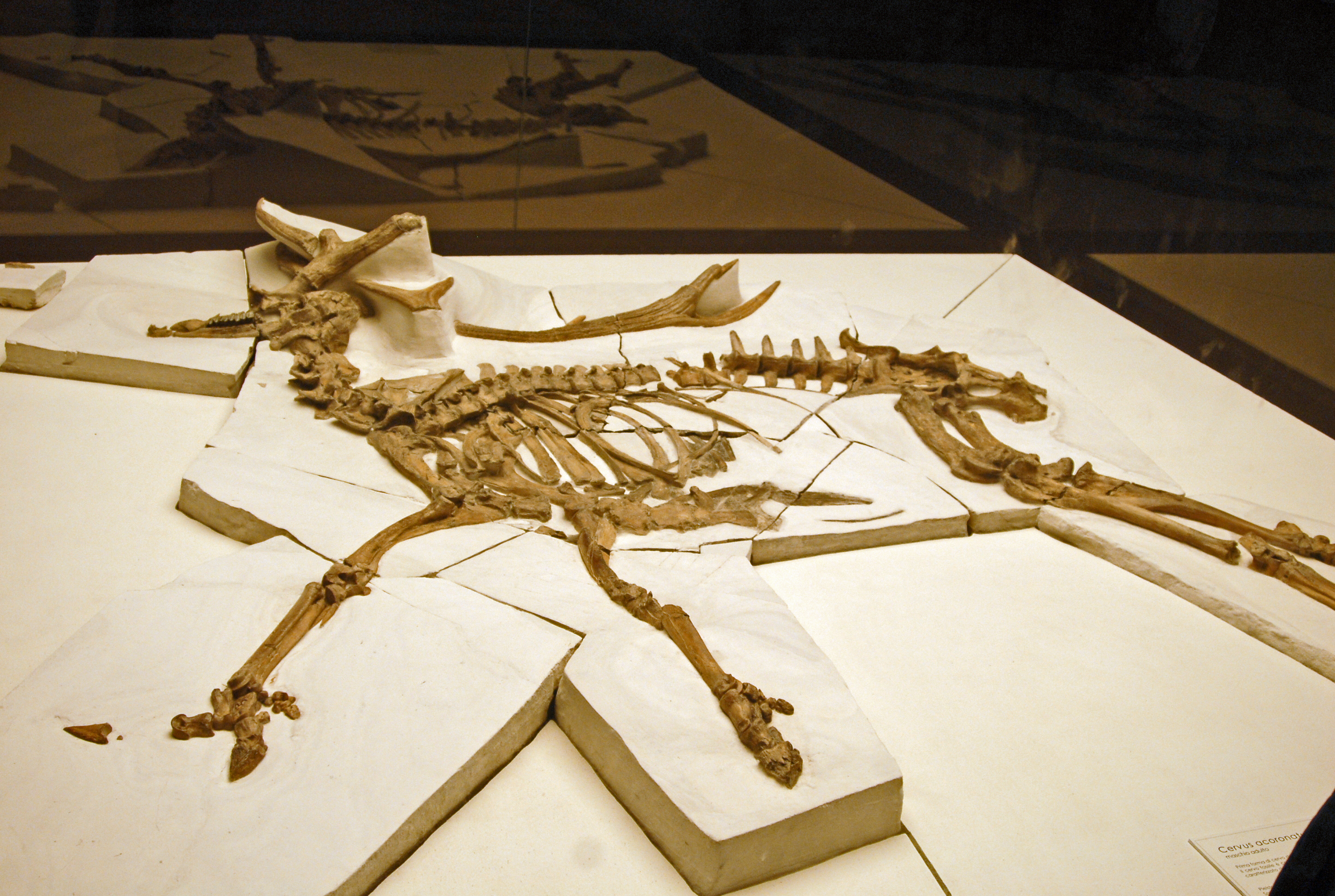
Alternate view of fossil

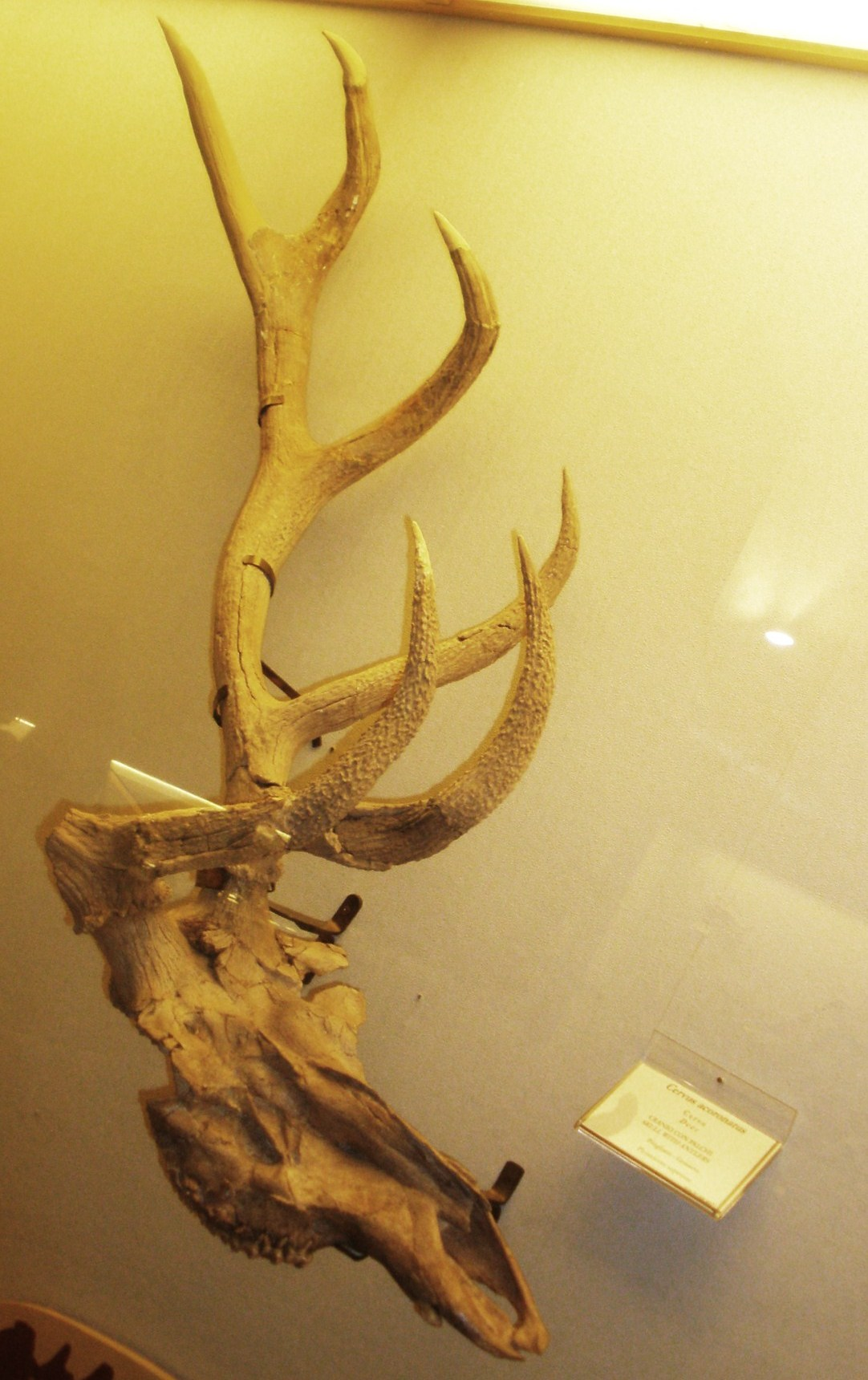
Skull

Cervus elaphus acoronatus was a red deer subspecies of large size, similar to that of the existing red deer, Cervus elaphus, with large and well-developed antlers. In this archaic form, the antlers lack at their apices, even in adult individuals, the characteristic multipointed "crown" (hence the Latin name acoronatus, meaning without crown). In this subspecies, the antlers have a simple distal fork oriented transversally to the axis of the body.

It is a deer of Eastern origin, reported in Central Europe in the Pleistocene. The fossil records of C. e. acoronatus start in the lower Middle Pleistocene. Later, the morphology of the antlers changed, developing the mentioned crown.
