= Rhaptonema =

Scientific classification
- Kingdom: Plantae
- Clade: Tracheophytes
- Clade: Angiosperms
- Clade: Eudicots
- Order: Ranunculales
- Family: Menispermaceae
- Genus: Rhaptonema; Miers

Synonyms
- Heterotypic Synonyms: Gamopoda Baker; Tripodandra Baill.

Genus of plants

Rhaptonema is a genus of flowering plants belonging to the family Menispermaceae. Its endemic to Madagascar.

== Species ==
Accepted species include:

- Rhaptonema bakeriana Diels
- Rhaptonema cancellata Miers
- Rhaptonema densiflora (Baker) Diels
- Rhaptonema glabrifolium Diels
- Rhaptonema latifolia Diels
- Rhaptonema swinglei Kundu & S.Guha
- Rhaptonema thouarsiana (Baill.) Diels
