= Rhigiocarya =

Scientific classification
- Kingdom: Plantae
- Clade: Tracheophytes
- Clade: Angiosperms
- Clade: Eudicots
- Order: Ranunculales
- Family: Menispermaceae
- Genus: Rhigiocarya; Miers

Synonyms
- Heterotypic Synonyms: Miersiophyton Engl.

Genus of plants

Rhigiocarya is a genus of flowering plants belonging to the family Menispermaceae. It is native to Benin, Cabinda Province, Cameroon, the Democratic Republic of the Congo, Equatorial Guinea, Gabon, Ghana, Guinea, Ivory Coast, Liberia, Nigeria, Republic of the Congo, and Sierra Leone.

== Species ==
Accepted species include:

- Rhigiocarya leonensis (Hutch. & Dalziel) Breteler
- Rhigiocarya nervosa (Miers) A.Chev.
- Rhigiocarya peltata J.Miège
- Rhigiocarya racemifera Miers
