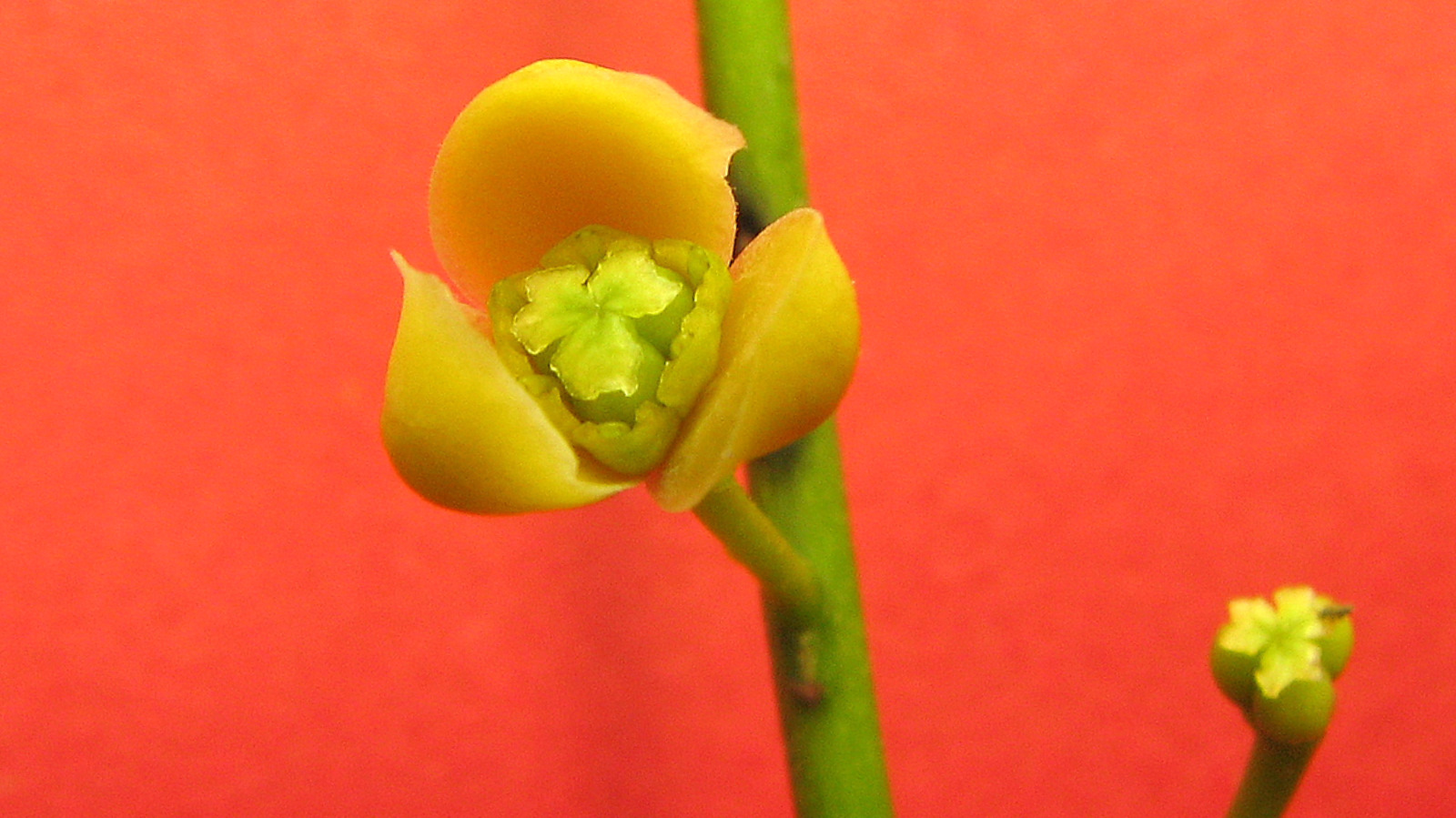
- Anomospermum reticulatum flower

Scientific classification
- Kingdom: Plantae
- Clade: Tracheophytes
- Clade: Angiosperms
- Clade: Eudicots
- Order: Ranunculales
- Family: Menispermaceae
- Subfamily: Menispermoideae
- Genus: Anomospermum; Miers (1851)

Synonyms
- Heterotypic Synonyms: Orthomene Barneby & Krukoff

= Anomospermum =

Genus of flowering plants

Anomospermum is a genus of flowering plants in the family Menispermaceae. It consists of nine species from tropical America, ranging from Nicaragua to southern Brazil.

== Species ==
Nine species are accepted as of May 2026.

- Anomospermum andersonii Krukoff
- Anomospermum chloranthum Diels
- Anomospermum hirsutum Krukoff & Moldenke
- Anomospermum matogrossense Krukoff & Barneby
- Anomospermum prancei (Barneby & Krukoff) R.Ortiz
- Anomospermum reticulatum (Mart.) Eichler
- Anomospermum schomburgkii Miers
- Anomospermum steyermarkii Krukoff & Barneby
- Anomospermum verruculosum (Krukoff & Barneby) R.Ortiz
