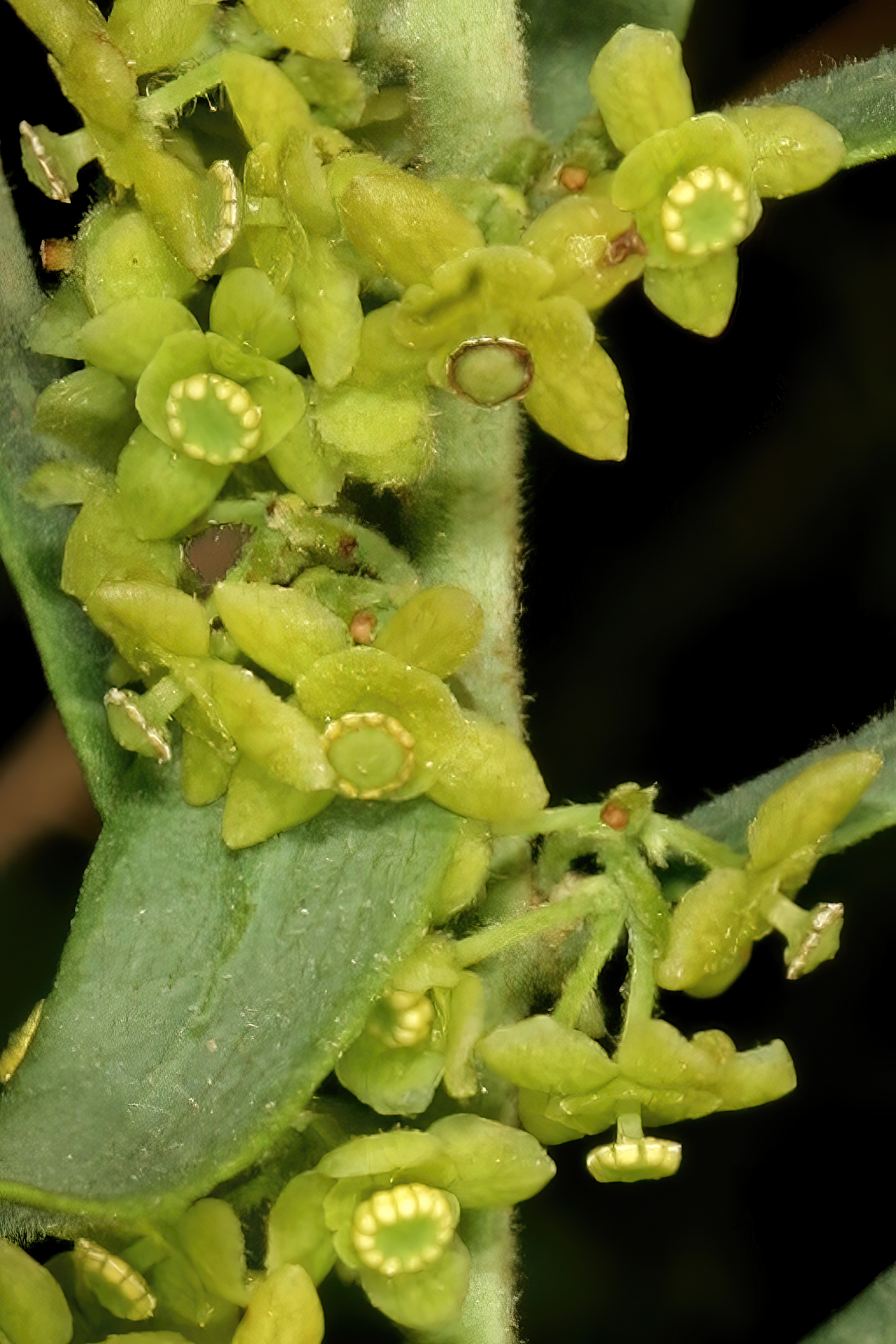
- Antizoma angustifolia

Scientific classification
- Kingdom: Plantae
- Clade: Tracheophytes
- Clade: Angiosperms
- Clade: Eudicots
- Order: Ranunculales
- Family: Menispermaceae
- Genus: Antizoma; Miers

= Antizoma =

Genus of flowering plants

Antizoma is a genus of flowering plants belonging to the family Menispermaceae. It is native to Angola, Botswana, Cape Provinces, Free State, KwaZulu-Natal, Namibia, and the Northern Provinces.

== Species ==
Accepted species include:

- Antizoma angolensis Exell & Mendonça
- Antizoma angustifolia (Burch.) Miers ex Harv.
- Antizoma miersiana Harv.
