= Elissarrhena =

Scientific classification
- Kingdom: Plantae
- Clade: Tracheophytes
- Clade: Angiosperms
- Clade: Eudicots
- Order: Ranunculales
- Family: Menispermaceae
- Genus: Elissarrhena; Miers

Genus of plants

Elissarrhena is a genus of flowering plants belonging to the family Menispermaceae.

Its native range is Bolivia, Brazil, Colombia, Ecuador, Guyana, and Peru.

== Species ==
Accepted species in the genus include:

- Elissarrhena grandifolia (Eichler) Diels
- Elissarrhena solimoesana (Moldenke) Wei Wang & R.Ortiz
