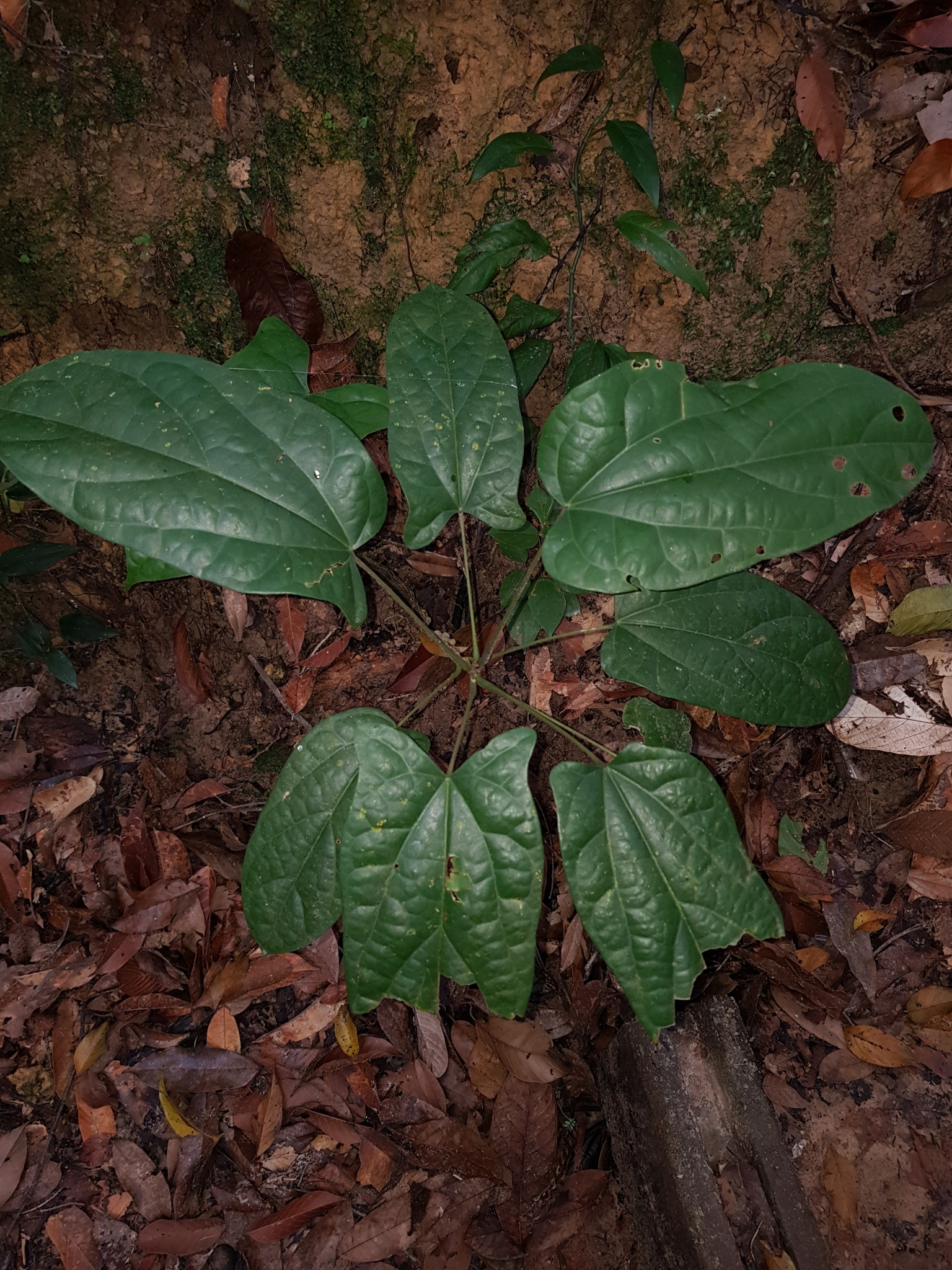
- Tinomiscium petiolare in Singapore

Scientific classification
- Kingdom: Plantae
- Clade: Tracheophytes
- Clade: Angiosperms
- Clade: Eudicots
- Order: Ranunculales
- Family: Menispermaceae
- Genus: Tinomiscium; Miers
- Species: T. petiolare

Binomial name
- Tinomiscium petiolare Miers ex Hook.f. & Thomson

Synonyms
- Species: Tinomiscium elasticum Becc.; Tinomiscium javanicum Miers; Tinomiscium micranthum Diels; Tinomiscium molle Diels; Tinomiscium philippinense Diels; Tinomiscium phytocrenoides Kurz ex Teijsm. & Binn.; Tinomiscium pyrrhobotryum Miq.; Tinomiscium tonkinense Gagnep.

= Tinomiscium =

Genus of flowering plants

Tinomiscium is a genus of flowering plants belonging to the family Menispermaceae. The only species is Tinomiscium petiolare. It is native to Assam, Borneo, south-central and southeast China, Java, Myanmar, New Guinea, the Nicobar Islands, Peninsular Malaysia, the Philippines, Sumatra, Thailand, and Vietnam.
