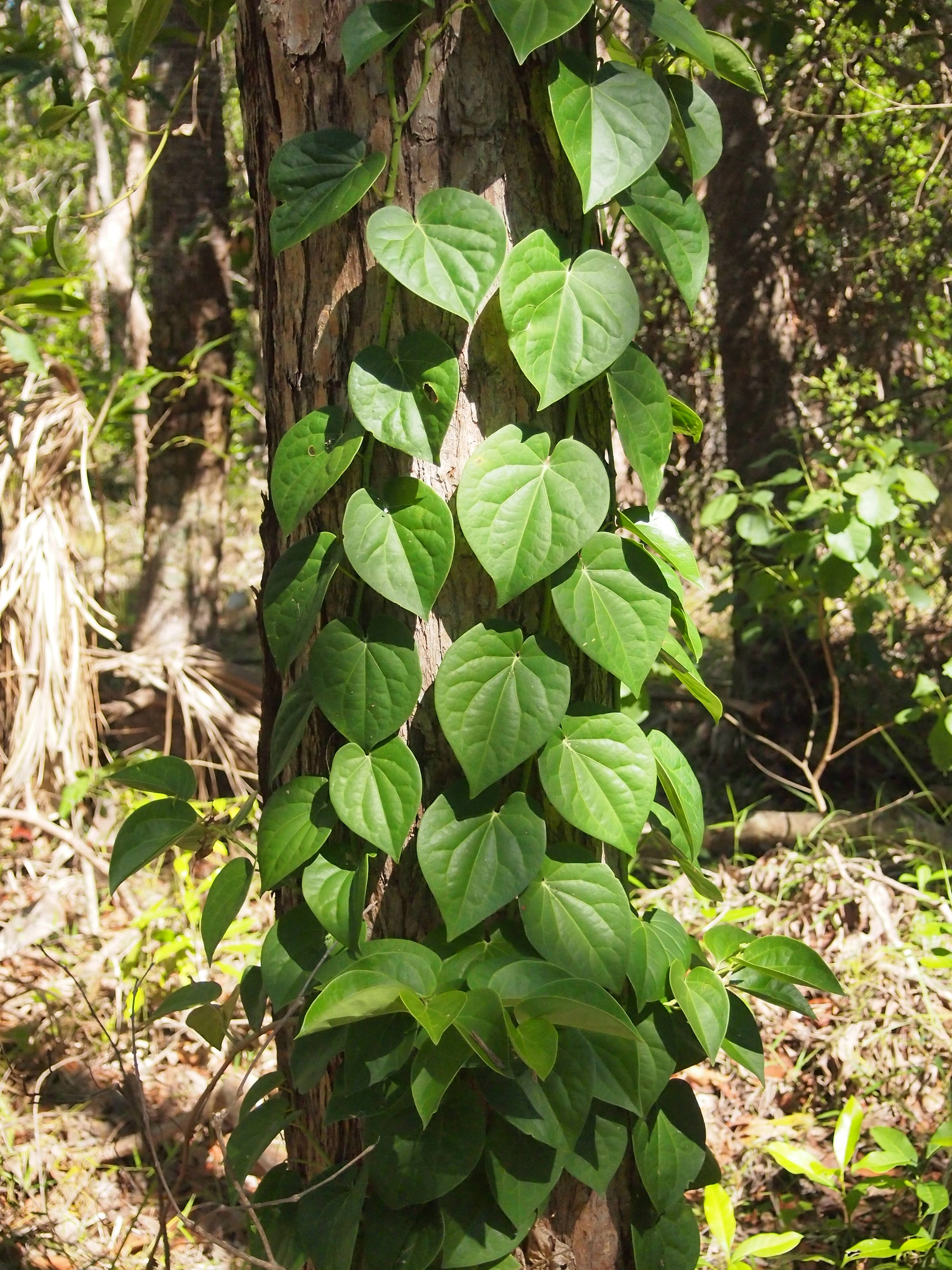
- Pleogyne australis

Scientific classification
- Kingdom: Plantae
- Clade: Tracheophytes
- Clade: Angiosperms
- Clade: Eudicots
- Order: Ranunculales
- Family: Menispermaceae
- Genus: Pleogyne; Miers
- Species: P. australis

Binomial name
- Pleogyne australis Benth.

Synonyms
- Homotypic Synonyms: Microclisia Benth.; Microclisia australis (Benth.) Miers; Heterotypic Synonyms: Pleogyne cunninghamii Miers

= Pleogyne =

Genus of plants

Pleogyne is a monotypic genus of flowering plants in the family Menispermaceae. The only species is Pleogyne australis. Its native range is northern Western Australia, northeastern and eastern Queensland.
