= Telitoxicum duckei =

Scientific classification
- Kingdom: Plantae
- Clade: Embryophytes
- Clade: Tracheophytes
- Clade: Spermatophytes
- Clade: Angiosperms
- Clade: Eudicots
- Order: Ranunculales
- Family: Menispermaceae
- Genus: Telitoxicum
- Species: T. duckei

Binomial name
- Telitoxicum duckei (Diels) Moldenke

Synonyms
- Abuta duckei Diels

Species of flowering plant

Telitoxicum duckei is a species of flowering plant first described in 1910 by Friedrich Ludwig Diels who gave it the name Abuta duckei in Das Pflanzenreich. In 1938, Harold Norman Moldenke transferred the species to Telitoxicum as T. duckei . No subspecies are listed in the Catalogue of Life.
