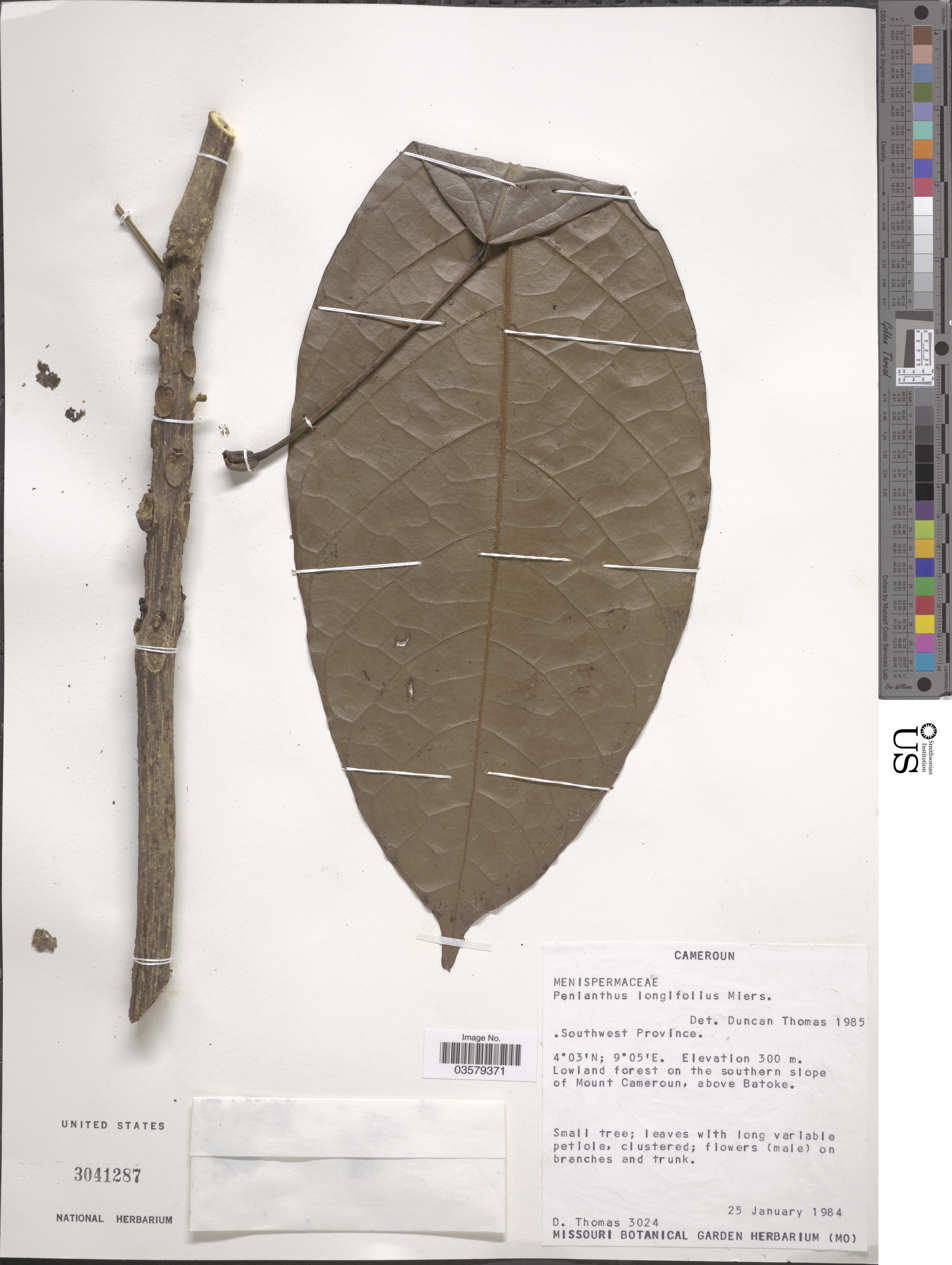
- Dried and pressed specimen of Penianthus longifolius

Scientific classification
- Kingdom: Plantae
- Clade: Tracheophytes
- Clade: Angiosperms
- Clade: Eudicots
- Order: Ranunculales
- Family: Menispermaceae
- Genus: Penianthus; Miers

Synonyms
- Heterotypic Synonyms: Heptacyclum Engl.

= Penianthus =

Genus of plants

Penianthus is a genus of flowering plants in the family Menispermaceae. Its native range includes: Cabinda Province, Cameroon, the Central African Republic, Democratic Republic of the Congo, Equatorial Guinea, Gabon, Ghana, the Gulf of Guinea Islands, Ivory Coast, Liberia, Nigeria, Republic of the Congo, and Sierra Leone.

== Species ==
Accepted species in the genus include:

- Penianthus camerounensis A.Dekker
- Penianthus longifolius Miers
- Penianthus zenkeri (Engl.) Diels
