= Syrrheonema =

Scientific classification
- Kingdom: Plantae
- Clade: Tracheophytes
- Clade: Angiosperms
- Clade: Eudicots
- Order: Ranunculales
- Family: Menispermaceae
- Genus: Syrrheonema; Miers

Synonyms
- Heterotypic Synonyms: Syrrhonema Miers; Zenkerophytum Engl. ex Diels

Genus of flowering plants

Syrrheonema is a genus of flowering plants belonging to the family Menispermaceae. It is native to Angola, Cameroon, the Central African Republic, the Democratic Republic of the Congo, Gabon, Ghana, Guinea, the Gulf of Guinea islands, Ivory Coast, Liberia, the Republic of the Congo, and Sierra Leone.

== Species ==
Accepted species include:

- Syrrheonema fasciculatum Miers
- Syrrheonema hexastamineum Keay
- Syrrheonema welwitschii (Hiern) Diels
