= Sciadotenia =

Scientific classification
- Kingdom: Plantae
- Clade: Tracheophytes
- Clade: Angiosperms
- Clade: Eudicots
- Order: Ranunculales
- Family: Menispermaceae
- Genus: Sciadotenia; Miers

Synonyms
- Heterotypic Synonyms: Detandra Miers; Sciadotaenia Benth.; Sychnosepalum Eichler; Tylopetalum Barneby & Krukoff

Genus of plants

Sciadotenia is a genus of flowering plants belonging to the family Menispermaceae. It is native to Bolivia, Brazil, Colombia, Ecuador, French Guiana, Guyana, Panama, Peru, Suriname, and Venezuela.

== Species ==
Accepted species include:

- Sciadotenia acutifolia Krukoff & Barneby
- Sciadotenia amazonica Eichler
- Sciadotenia brachypoda Diels
- Sciadotenia campestris Barneby
- Sciadotenia cayennensis Benth.
- Sciadotenia duckei Moldenke
- Sciadotenia eichleriana Moldenke
- Sciadotenia javariensis Moldenke
- Sciadotenia mathiasiana Krukoff & Barneby
- Sciadotenia nitida (L.Riley) Krukoff & Barneby
- Sciadotenia pachnococca Krukoff & Barneby
- Sciadotenia paraensis (Eichler) Diels
- Sciadotenia peruviana Krukoff & Barneby
- Sciadotenia pubistaminea (K.Schum.) Diels
- Sciadotenia ramiflora Eichler
- Sciadotenia sagotiana (Eichler) Diels
- Sciadotenia solimoesana Moldenke
- Sciadotenia sprucei Diels
- Sciadotenia toxifera Krukoff & A.C.Sm.
