= Parabaena =

Scientific classification
- Kingdom: Plantae
- Clade: Tracheophytes
- Clade: Angiosperms
- Clade: Eudicots
- Order: Ranunculales
- Family: Menispermaceae
- Genus: Parabaena; Miers

Genus of plants

Parabaena is a genus of flowering plants in the family Menispermaceae. Its native range includes the Andaman Islands, Assam, Bangladesh, Borneo, China, East Himalaya, India, Laos, Myanmar, Nepal, New Guinea, the Nicobar Islands, the Philippines, the Solomon Islands, Thailand, Tibet, and Vietnam.

== Fossil record ==
Pliocene seed and fruit fossils of †Parabaena rhenana are described from sand-filled river-channels in the brown coal pit of Fortuna-Garsdorf near Bergheim, North Rhine-Westphalia in Germany.

== Species ==
Accepted species in the genus include:

- Parabaena denudata Diels
- Parabaena echinocarpa Diels
- Parabaena elmeri Diels
- Parabaena megalocarpa Merr.
- Parabaena sagittata Miers ex Hook.f. & Thomson
- Parabaena tuberculata Becc.
