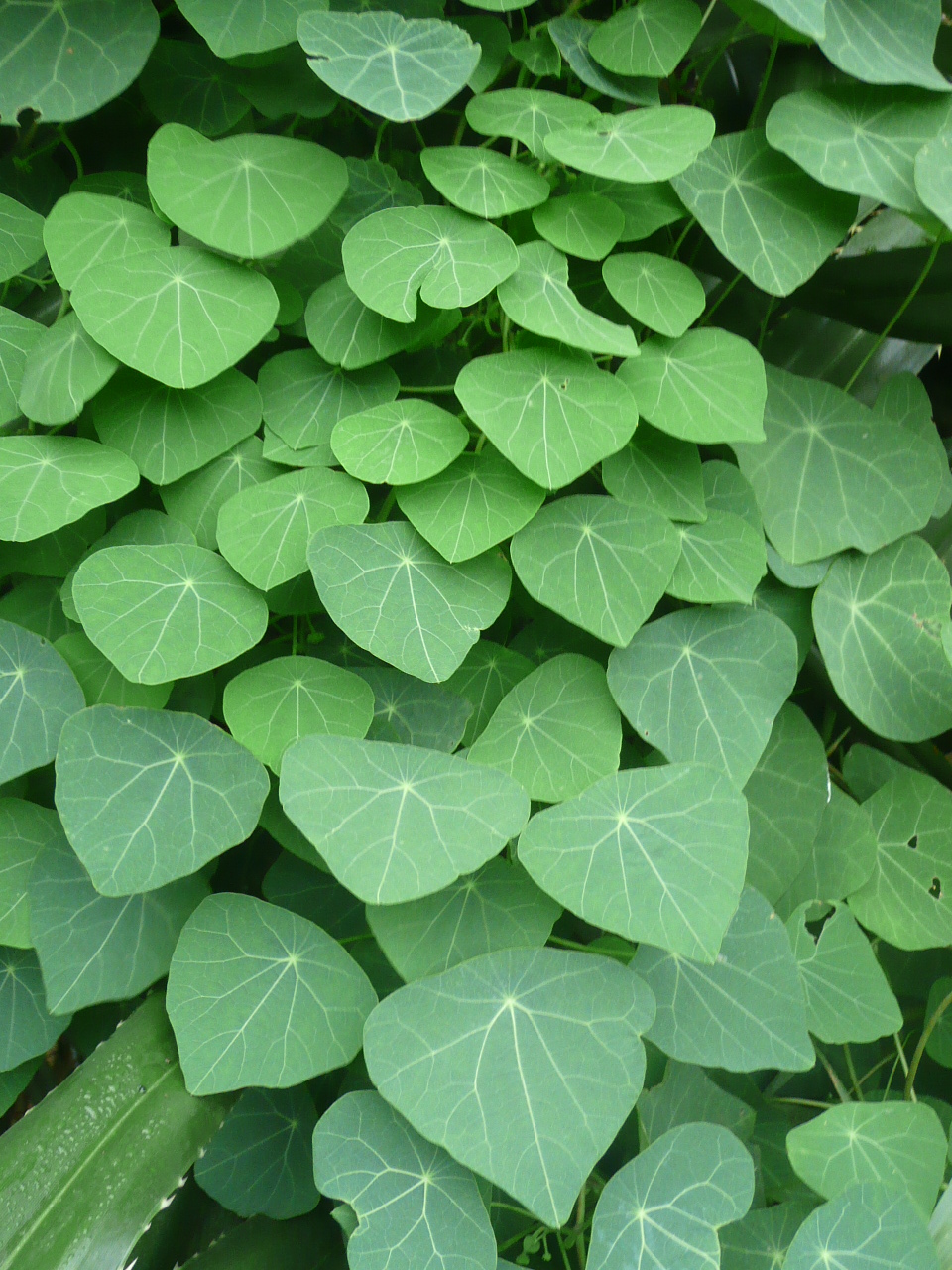

Scientific classification
- Kingdom: Plantae
- Clade: Tracheophytes
- Clade: Angiosperms
- Clade: Eudicots
- Order: Ranunculales
- Family: Menispermaceae
- Genus: Perichasma; Miers

= Perichasma =

Genus of flowering plants

Perichasma is a genus of flowering plants in the family Menispermaceae. Its native range includes: Cabinda Province, Cameroon, the Central African Republic, the Democratic Republic of the Congo, the Gulf of Guinea Islands, Nigeria, and the Republic of the Congo.

== Species ==
Accepted species in the genus include:

- Perichasma laetificata Miers
- Perichasma miersii Kundu & S.Guha
