= Beirnaertia =

Scientific classification
- Kingdom: Plantae
- Clade: Embryophytes
- Clade: Tracheophytes
- Clade: Spermatophytes
- Clade: Angiosperms
- Clade: Eudicots
- Order: Ranunculales
- Family: Menispermaceae
- Genus: Beirnaertia; Louis ex Troupin (1949)
- Species: B. cabindensis

Binomial name
- Beirnaertia cabindensis (Exell & Mendonça) Troupin (1959)

Synonyms
- Beirnaertia yangambiensis Louis ex Troupin (1949); Tiliacora cabindensis Exell & Mendonça (1935)

Genus of flowering plants

Beirnaertia cabindensis is a species of flowering plant belonging to the family Menispermaceae. It is a liana native to Cabinda, Gabon, Central African Republic, Republic of the Congo, and Democratic Republic of the Congo in west-central tropical Africa. It is the sole species in genus Beirnaertia.
