= Platytinospora =

Conservation status
- Near Threatened (IUCN 3.1)

Scientific classification
- Kingdom: Plantae
- Clade: Tracheophytes
- Clade: Angiosperms
- Clade: Eudicots
- Order: Ranunculales
- Family: Menispermaceae
- Genus: Platytinospora (Engl.) Diels
- Species: P. buchholzii

Binomial name
- Platytinospora buchholzii (Engl.) Diels

Synonyms
- Tinospora buchholzii Engl.

Genus of plants

Platytinospora is a monotypic genus of flowering plants belonging to the family Menispermaceae. The only species is Platytinospora buchholzii.

Its native range is Cameroon.
