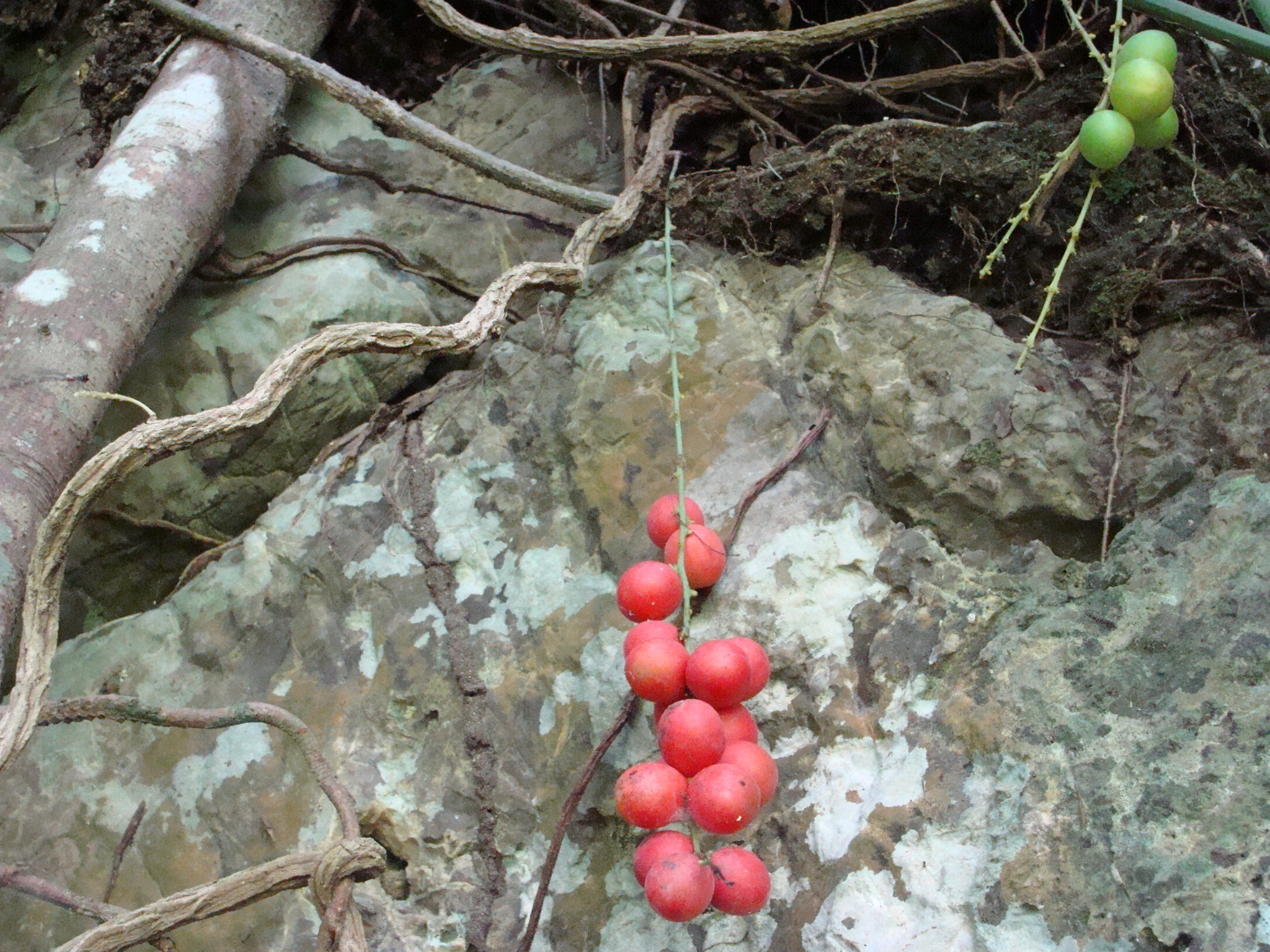
- Disciphania calocarpa fruit

Scientific classification
- Kingdom: Plantae
- Clade: Tracheophytes
- Clade: Angiosperms
- Clade: Eudicots
- Order: Ranunculales
- Family: Menispermaceae
- Genus: Disciphania; Eichler

= Disciphania =

Genus of plants

Disciphania is a genus of flowering plants belonging to the family Menispermaceae.

Its native range is Mexico, Central and southern Tropical America.

Species:

- Disciphania calocarpa Standl.
- Disciphania cardiophylla Standl.
- Disciphania contraversa Barneby
- Disciphania convolvulacea (Poepp.) Diels
- Disciphania cubijensis (Knuth) Sandwith
- Disciphania dioscoreoides Barneby
- Disciphania domingensis Urb.
- Disciphania ernstii Eichler
- Disciphania hernandia (Vell.) Barneby
- Disciphania heterophylla Barneby
- Disciphania inversa Barneby
- Disciphania juliflora Barneby
- Disciphania killipii Diels
- Disciphania lobata Eichler
- Disciphania mexicana Bullock
- Disciphania modesta Diels
- Disciphania moriorum Barneby
- Disciphania remota Diels
- Disciphania sagittaria Barneby
- Disciphania sarcostephana Barneby
- Disciphania smithii Barneby
- Disciphania spadicea Barneby
- Disciphania tessmannii Diels
- Disciphania tricaudata Barneby
- Disciphania unilateralis Barneby
