= Atriaecarpum =

Scientific classification
- Kingdom: Plantae
- Clade: Tracheophytes
- Clade: Angiosperms
- Clade: Eudicots
- Order: Ranunculales
- Family: Menispermaceae
- Genus: †Atriaecarpum; Chandler, 1978

Extinct genus of flowering plant

Atriaecarpum is an extinct genus of flowering plant in the family Menispermaceae and the tribe Tinosporeae. Species assigned to this genus include Atriaecarpum clarnense, Atriaecarpum deltiforme, and Atriaecarpum venablesii. The genus was named by Marjorie E.J. Chandler.
