= Aspidocarya =

Scientific classification
- Kingdom: Plantae
- Clade: Tracheophytes
- Clade: Angiosperms
- Clade: Eudicots
- Order: Ranunculales
- Family: Menispermaceae
- Genus: Aspidocarya; Hook.f. & Thomson

Genus of flowering plants

Aspidocarya is a genus of flowering plants belonging to the family Menispermaceae.

Its native range is Eastern Himalaya to Southern Central China.

Species:

- Aspidocarya uvifera Hook.f. & Thomson
