= Arcangelisia =

Scientific classification
- Kingdom: Plantae
- Clade: Tracheophytes
- Clade: Angiosperms
- Clade: Eudicots
- Order: Ranunculales
- Family: Menispermaceae
- Genus: Arcangelisia; Becc.

Genus of flowering plants

Arcangelisia is a genus of flowering plants belonging to the family Menispermaceae.

Its native range is Hainan to Indo-China and New Guinea.

== Species ==
The genus has the following species:

- Arcangelisia flava (L.) Merr.
- Arcangelisia gusanlung H.S.Lo
- Arcangelisia tympanopoda (K.Schum. & Lauterb.) Diels
