= Caryomene =

Scientific classification
- Kingdom: Plantae
- Clade: Tracheophytes
- Clade: Angiosperms
- Clade: Eudicots
- Order: Ranunculales
- Family: Menispermaceae
- Genus: Caryomene; Barneby & Krukoff

Genus of flowering plants

Caryomene is a genus of flowering plants belonging to the family Menispermaceae.

Its native range is Southern Tropical America.

Species:

- Caryomene foveolata Barneby & Krukoff
- Caryomene glaucescens (Moldenke) Barneby & Krukoff
- Caryomene grandifolia Barneby & Krukoff
- Caryomene olivascens Barneby & Krukoff
- Caryomene prumnoides Barneby & Krukoff
