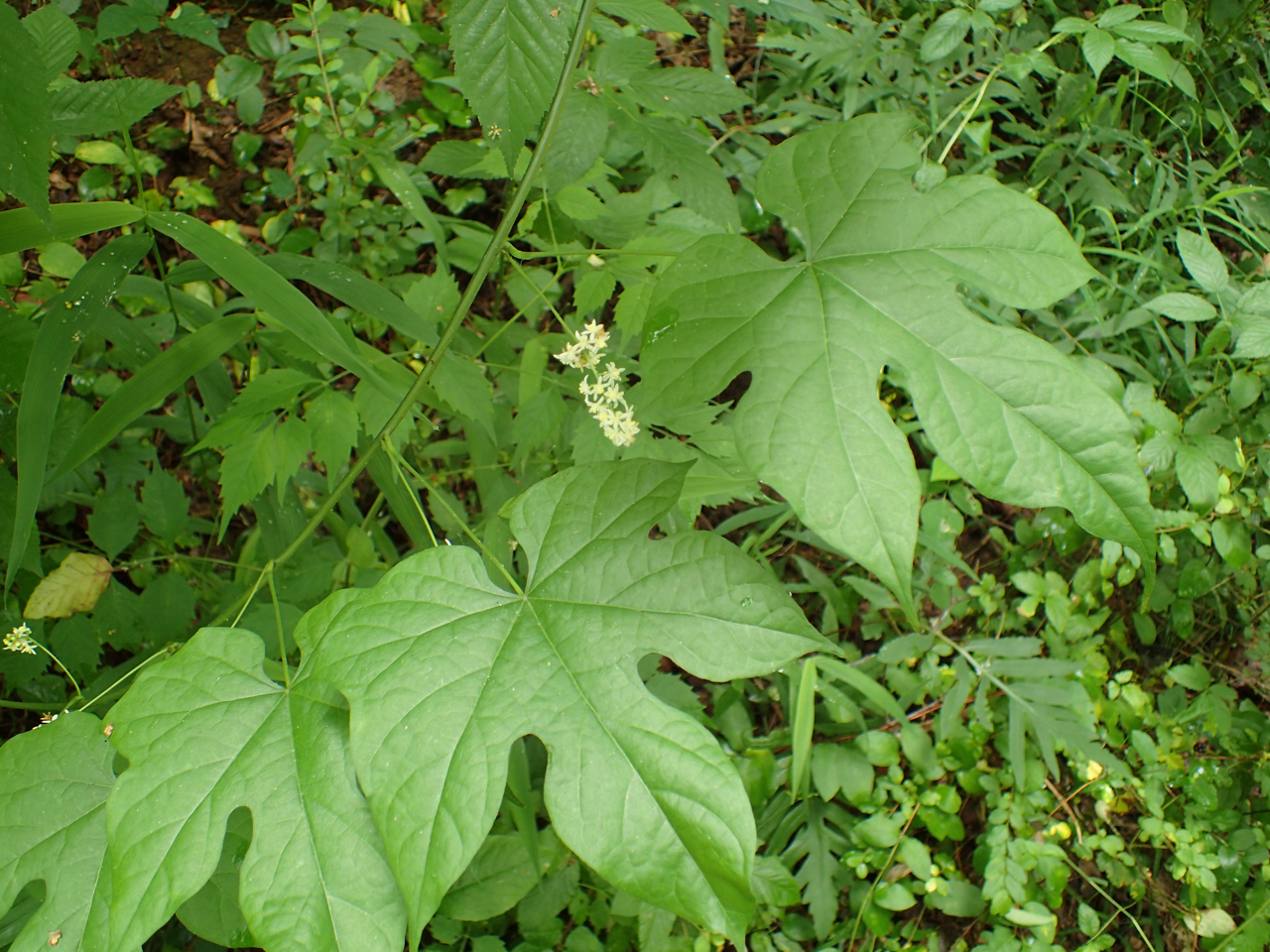

Scientific classification
- Kingdom: Plantae
- Clade: Embryophytes
- Clade: Tracheophytes
- Clade: Spermatophytes
- Clade: Angiosperms
- Clade: Eudicots
- Order: Ranunculales
- Family: Menispermaceae
- Genus: Calycocarpum; Nuttall ex Spach
- Species: C. lyonii

Binomial name
- Calycocarpum lyonii (Pursh) A. Gray

Synonyms
- Menispermum dubium Muhl. ex Raf.; Menispermum lyonii Pursh

= Calycocarpum =

Cupseed

Genus of flowering plants

Calycocarpum (cupseed) is a monotypic genus of flowering plants in the family Menispermaceae. The only species currently accepted is Calycocarpum lyonii endemic to the southeastern United States.

Calycocarpum lyonii has been reported from Texas, Louisiana, Oklahoma, Arkansas, southeastern Kansas, Missouri, southern Illinois, southern Indiana, Kentucky, Tennessee, Mississippi, Alabama, Georgia, northwestern Florida and southern South Carolina. It grows mostly along stream banks in deciduous forests at elevations less than 350 m (1,150 ft).

Calycocarpum lyonii is a vine climbing over other vegetation, often to the tops of tall forest trees. Leaves are broad, pentagonally lobed, up to 30 cm (12 in) across and 25 cm (9.8 in) long. Flowers are borne in racemes or panicles up to 35 cm (14 in) long. Drupes are green, drying black, spherical to ellipsoid, up to 25 mm (0.98 in) long.
