= Telitoxicum =

Scientific classification
- Kingdom: Plantae
- Clade: Tracheophytes
- Clade: Angiosperms
- Clade: Eudicots
- Order: Ranunculales
- Family: Menispermaceae
- Genus: Telitoxicum; Moldenke

Genus of flowering plants

Telitoxicum is a genus of flowering plants belonging to the family Menispermaceae.

Its native range is Colombia, Ecuador, French Guiana, Guyana, North Region, Brazil, Northeast Region, Brazil, Peru, Southeast Region, Brazil, Suriname, and Venezuela.

Species:

- Telitoxicum duckei (Diels) Moldenke
- Telitoxicum glaziovii Moldenke
- Telitoxicum inopinatum Moldenke
- Telitoxicum krukovii Moldenke
- Telitoxicum minutiflorum (Diels) Moldenke
- Telitoxicum negroense (Krukoff & Moldenke) Krukoff
- Telitoxicum peruvianum Moldenke
- Telitoxicum rodriguesii Krukoff
