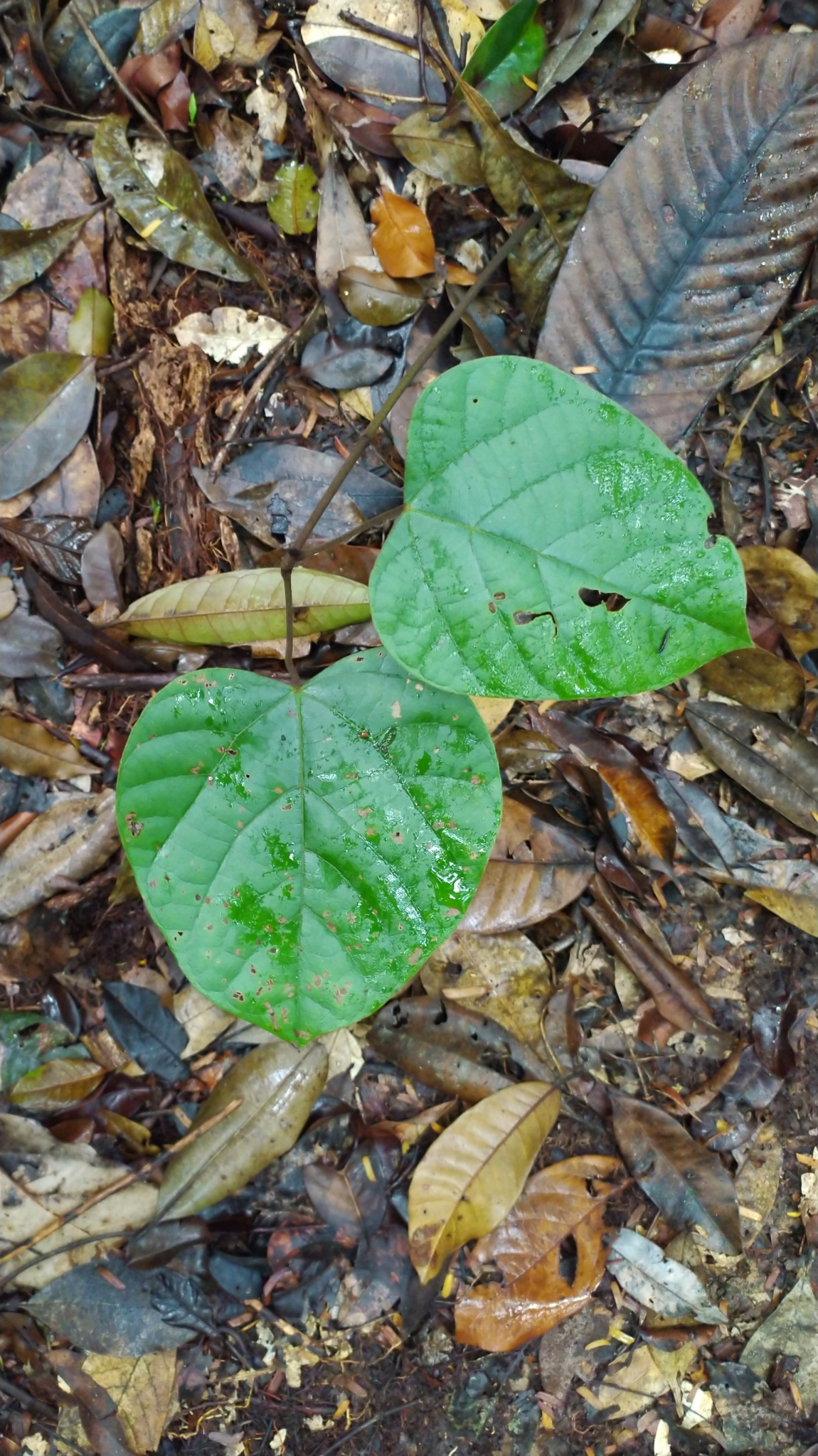
- Elephantomene eburnea

Scientific classification
- Kingdom: Plantae
- Clade: Tracheophytes
- Clade: Angiosperms
- Clade: Eudicots
- Order: Ranunculales
- Family: Menispermaceae
- Genus: Elephantomene; Barneby & Krukoff
- Species: E. eburnea

Binomial name
- Elephantomene eburnea Barneby & Krukoff

= Elephantomene =

Genus of plants

Elephantomene is a monotypic genus of flowering plants belonging to the family Menispermaceae. The only species is Elephantomene eburnea.

Its native range is Southern Tropical America.
