= Limaciopsis =

Scientific classification
- Kingdom: Plantae
- Clade: Tracheophytes
- Clade: Angiosperms
- Clade: Eudicots
- Order: Ranunculales
- Family: Menispermaceae
- Genus: Limaciopsis; Engl.

Genus of plants

Limaciopsis is a genus of flowering plants belonging to the family Menispermaceae.

Its native range is Western Central Tropical Africa to Angola.

Species:

- Limaciopsis loangensis Engl.
