= Sarcolophium =

Scientific classification
- Kingdom: Plantae
- Clade: Tracheophytes
- Clade: Angiosperms
- Clade: Eudicots
- Order: Ranunculales
- Family: Menispermaceae
- Genus: Sarcolophium; Troupin
- Species: S. suberosum

Binomial name
- Sarcolophium suberosum (Diels) Troupin

Genus of plants

Sarcolophium is a monotypic genus of flowering plants belonging to the family Menispermaceae. The only species is Sarcolophium suberosum.

Its native range is Western Central Tropical Africa.
