= Echinostephia =

Scientific classification
- Kingdom: Plantae
- Clade: Tracheophytes
- Clade: Angiosperms
- Clade: Eudicots
- Order: Ranunculales
- Family: Menispermaceae
- Genus: Echinostephia (Diels) Domin

Genus of flowering plants

Echinostephia is a genus of flowering plants belonging to the family Menispermaceae.

Its native range is Eastern Australia.

Species:

- Echinostephia aculeata (F.M.Bailey) Domin
