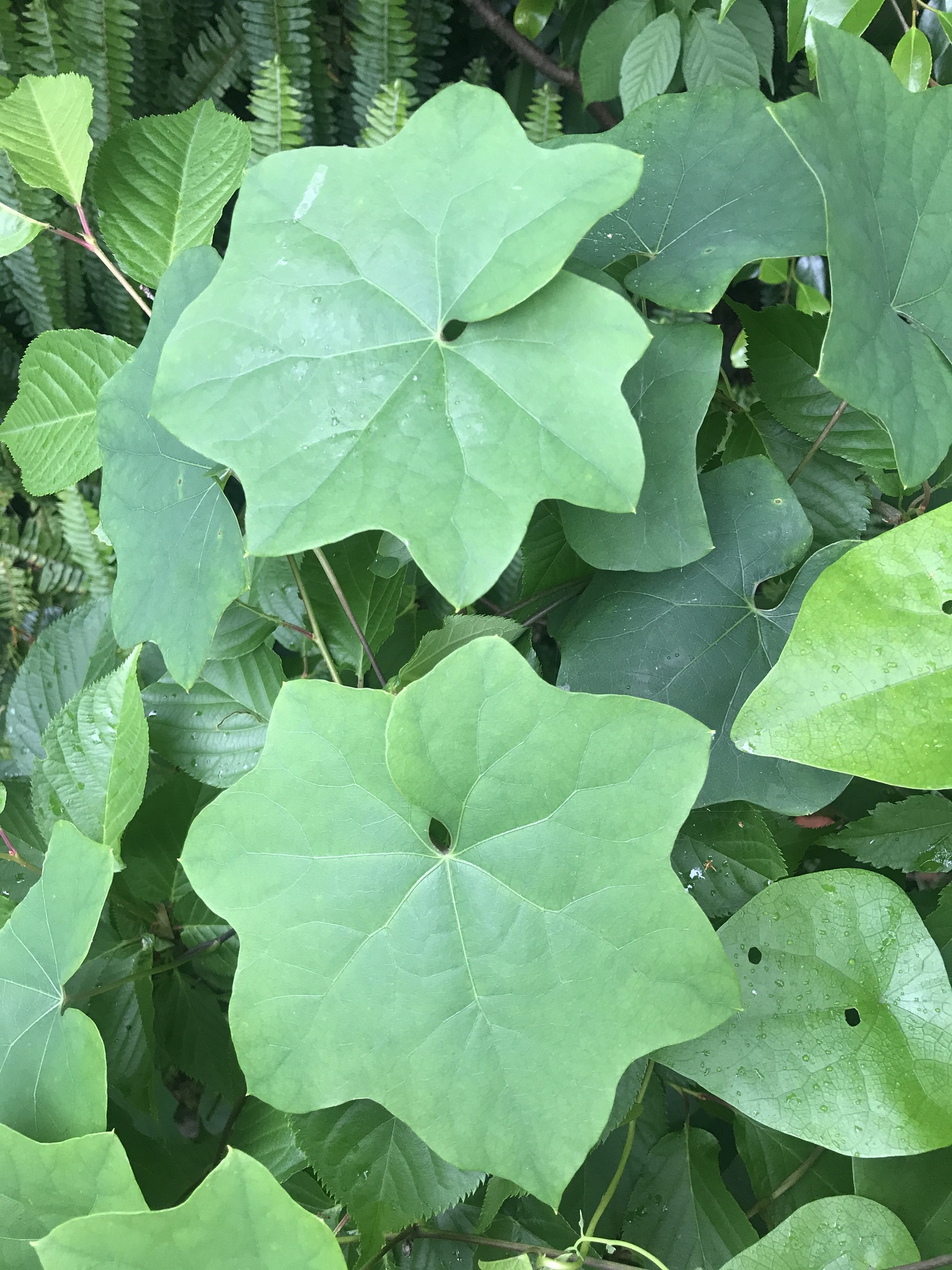
- Sinomenium acutum in Japan

Scientific classification
- Kingdom: Plantae
- Clade: Tracheophytes
- Clade: Angiosperms
- Clade: Eudicots
- Order: Ranunculales
- Family: Menispermaceae
- Genus: Sinomenium; Diels
- Species: S. acutum

Binomial name
- Sinomenium acutum (Thunb.) Rehder & E.H.Wilson

Synonyms
- Cocculus diversifolius Miq. 1867, illegitimate homonym, not DC. 1817; Cocculus diversifolius var. cinereus Diels; Cocculus variiformis Hemsl.; Marsdenia acuta (Thunb.) Tanaka; Menispermum acutum Thunb.; Menispermum diversifolium Spreng.; Menispermum diversifolium Gagnep.; Menispermum diversifolium var. molle Gagnep.; Sinomenium acutum var. cinereum (Diels) Rehder & E.H.Wilson; Sinomenium diversifolium Diels (type species)

= Sinomenium =

Genus of plants

Sinomenium is a genus of plant in family Menispermaceae first described as a genus in 1910. It contains only one known species, Sinomenium acutum, native to China, northern India, Nepal, Japan, northern Thailand, and also Korea.

== Fossil record ==
Sinomenium macrofossils have been recovered from the late Zanclean stage of Pliocene sites in Pocapaglia, Italy. Macrofossils of Sinomenium cantalense have been recovered from the Zanclean stage of the Pliocene epoch in Western Georgia in the Caucasus region.
