= Dialytheca =

Scientific classification
- Kingdom: Plantae
- Clade: Embryophytes
- Clade: Tracheophytes
- Clade: Spermatophytes
- Clade: Angiosperms
- Clade: Eudicots
- Order: Ranunculales
- Family: Menispermaceae
- Genus: Dialytheca; Exell & Mendonça
- Species: D. gossweileri

Binomial name
- Dialytheca gossweileri Exell & Mendonça

Genus of plants

Dialytheca is a monotypic genus of flowering plants belonging to the family Menispermaceae. The only species is Dialytheca gossweileri.

Its native range is Western Central Tropical Africa.
