= Macrococculus =

Scientific classification
- Kingdom: Plantae
- Clade: Tracheophytes
- Clade: Angiosperms
- Clade: Eudicots
- Order: Ranunculales
- Family: Menispermaceae
- Genus: Macrococculus; Becc.
- Species: M. pomifer

Binomial name
- Macrococculus pomifer Becc.

Genus of plants

Macrococculus is a monotypic genus of flowering plants belonging to the family Menispermaceae. The only species is Macrococculus pomifer.

Its native range is Papuasia.
