= Eleutharrhena =

Scientific classification
- Kingdom: Plantae
- Clade: Tracheophytes
- Clade: Angiosperms
- Clade: Eudicots
- Order: Ranunculales
- Family: Menispermaceae
- Genus: Eleutharrhena; Formánek

Genus of plants

Eleutharrhena is a genus of flowering plants belonging to the family Menispermaceae.

Its native range is Assam to Southern Central China.

Species:

- Eleutharrhena macrocarpa (Diels) Ecrman
