= Rupertiella =

Scientific classification
- Kingdom: Plantae
- Clade: Embryophytes
- Clade: Tracheophytes
- Clade: Angiosperms
- Clade: Eudicots
- Order: Ranunculales
- Family: Menispermaceae
- Genus: Rupertiella; Wei Wang & R.Ortiz
- Species: R. boliviana

Binomial name
- Rupertiella boliviana (Krukoff & Moldenke) Wei Wang & R.Ortiz

Genus of plants

Rupertiella is a monotypic genus of flowering plants belonging to the family Menispermaceae. The only species is Rupertiella boliviana, previously known as Anomospermum bolivianum.

Its native range is Western South America to Brazil.
