= Kolobopetalum =

Scientific classification
- Kingdom: Plantae
- Clade: Tracheophytes
- Clade: Angiosperms
- Clade: Eudicots
- Order: Ranunculales
- Family: Menispermaceae
- Genus: Kolobopetalum; Engl.

Genus of plants

Kolobopetalum is a genus of flowering plants belonging to the family Menispermaceae.

Its native range is Western and Western Central Tropical Africa.

Species:

- Kolobopetalum auriculatum Engl.
- Kolobopetalum chevalieri (Hutch. & Dalziel) Troupin
- Kolobopetalum leonense Hutch. & Dalziel
- Kolobopetalum ovatum Stapf
