= Orthogynium =

Scientific classification
- Kingdom: Plantae
- Clade: Tracheophytes
- Clade: Angiosperms
- Clade: Eudicots
- Order: Ranunculales
- Family: Menispermaceae
- Genus: Orthogynium; Baill.
- Species: O. gomphloides

Binomial name
- Orthogynium gomphloides (DC.) Baill.

Genus of plants

Orthogynium is a monotypic genus of flowering plants belonging to the family Menispermaceae. The only species is Orthogynium gomphloides.

Its native range is Madagascar.
