= Paratinospora =

Scientific classification
- Kingdom: Plantae
- Clade: Embryophytes
- Clade: Tracheophytes
- Clade: Spermatophytes
- Clade: Angiosperms
- Clade: Eudicots
- Order: Ranunculales
- Family: Menispermaceae
- Genus: Paratinospora; Wei Wang (2016)

Species
- Paratinospora dentata (Diels) Wei Wang; Paratinospora sagittata (Oliv.) Wei Wang

Genus of flowering plants

Paratinaspora is a genus of flowering plants in the family Menispermaceae. It includes two species native to China, Tibet, Vietnam, and Taiwan:

- Paratinospora dentata (Diels) Wei Wang – Taiwan
- Paratinospora sagittata (Oliv.) Wei Wang – southern and north-central China, Hainan, Tibet, and Vietnam
