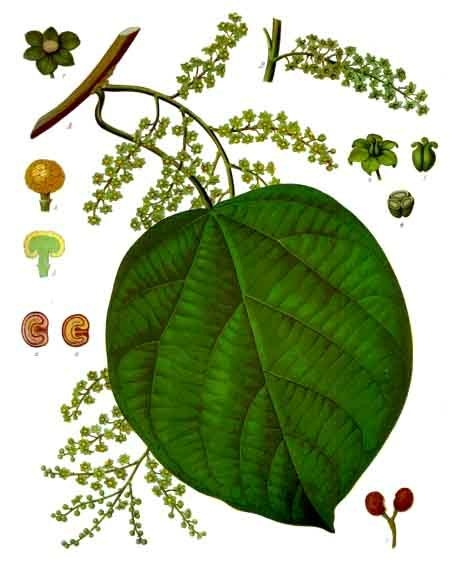

Scientific classification
- Kingdom: Plantae
- Clade: Tracheophytes
- Clade: Angiosperms
- Clade: Eudicots
- Order: Ranunculales
- Family: Menispermaceae
- Genus: Anamirta; Colebr.

Type species
- Anamirta paniculata Colebr.

Species
- See text

= Anamirta =

Genus of flowering plants

Anamirta is a genus of woody vines in the family of Menispermaceae, native to southern Asia. It has a single extant species, which is Anamirta cocculus.

== Species ==
Extant species:

- Anamirta cocculus

Fossil species:

- Anamirta pfeiffer

Former species include:

- Anamirta loureiroi Pierre (Cambodia) = Arcangelisia flava
- Anamirta lemniscata Miers (Java) = Arcangelisia flava
- Anamirta luctuosa Miers (Java) = Arcangelisia flava
