= Chlaenandra =

Scientific classification
- Kingdom: Plantae
- Clade: Tracheophytes
- Clade: Angiosperms
- Clade: Eudicots
- Order: Ranunculales
- Family: Menispermaceae
- Genus: Chlaenandra; Miq.

Genus of flowering plants

Chlaenandra is a genus of flowering plants belonging to the family Menispermaceae.

Its native range is New Guinea.

Species:

- Chlaenandra ovata Miq.
