= Limacia (plant) =

- Limacia oblonga

Scientific classification
- Kingdom: Plantae
- Clade: Tracheophytes
- Clade: Angiosperms
- Clade: Eudicots
- Order: Ranunculales
- Family: Menispermaceae
- Genus: Limacia; Lour. (1790)

Species
- Limacia blumei (Boerl.) Diels; Limacia oblonga Hook.f. & Thomson; Limacia scandens Lour.

Genus of flowering plants

Limacia is a genus of flowering plants in the family Menispermaceae. It includes three species of lianas native to Indochina and Malesia.

- Limacia blumei (Boerl.) Diels – Thailand, Philippines, Borneo, Java, Sulawesi, and the Lesser Sunda Islands
- Limacia oblonga Hook.f. & Thomson – Peninsular Thailand, Peninsular Malaysia, Borneo, and Sumatra
- Limacia scandens Lour. – Myanmar, Laos, Vietnam, Thailand, Peninsular Malaysia, Sumatra, Borneo, and the Philippines
