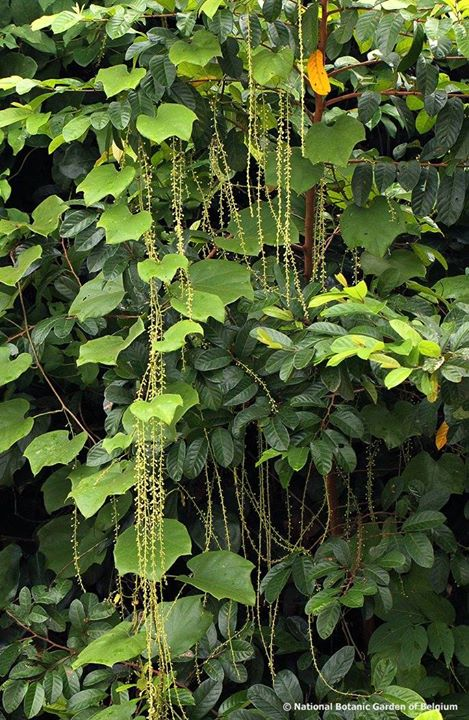
- Chasmanthera welwitschii trouping from riverbanks in DR Congo

Scientific classification
- Kingdom: Plantae
- Clade: Embryophytes
- Clade: Tracheophytes
- Clade: Spermatophytes
- Clade: Angiosperms
- Clade: Eudicots
- Order: Ranunculales
- Family: Menispermaceae
- Subfamily: Chasmantheroideae
- Genus: Chasmanthera; Hochst.

= Chasmanthera =

Genus of flowering plants

Chasmanthera is a genus of flowering plants belonging to the family Menispermaceae.

Its native range is tropical Africa.

Species:

- Chasmanthera dependens Hochst.
- Chasmanthera uviformis Baill.
- Chasmanthera welwitschii Troupin
