= Spirospermum =

Scientific classification
- Kingdom: Plantae
- Clade: Tracheophytes
- Clade: Angiosperms
- Clade: Eudicots
- Order: Ranunculales
- Family: Menispermaceae
- Subfamily: Menispermoideae
- Genus: Spirospermum; Thouars

Genus of plants

Spirospermum is a genus of flowering plants belonging to the family Menispermaceae.

Its native range is Madagascar.

Species:

- Spirospermum penduliflorum DC.
