= Georgesia =

Scientific classification
- Kingdom: Plantae
- Clade: Tracheophytes
- Clade: Angiosperms
- Clade: Eudicots
- Order: Ranunculales
- Family: Menispermaceae
- Subfamily: Menispermoideae
- Tribe: Tiliacoreae
- Genus: Georgesia; L.Lian & Wei Wang
- Species: G. cymosa

Binomial name
- Georgesia cymosa (Troupin) L.Lian & Wei Wang

Synonyms
- Anisocycla cymosa Troupin (1949) (basionym)

Genus of flowering plants

Georgesia is a genus of flowering plants in the family Menispermaceae. It includes a single species, Georgesia cymosa, a liana native to the Democratic Republic of the Congo and Republic of the Congo.

The species was first described as Anisocycla cymosa by Georges Troupin in 1949. In 2023 Lian Lian & Wei Wang placed the species the newly-described monotypic genus Georgesia as Georgesia cymosa.
