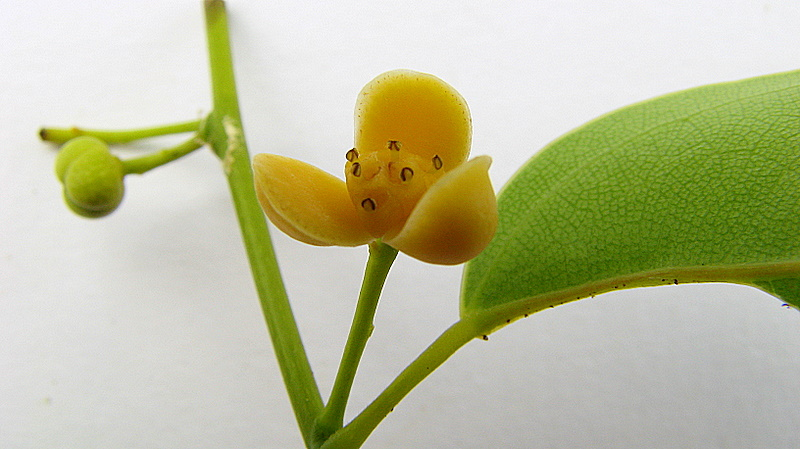
- Orthomene schomburgkii

Scientific classification
- Kingdom: Plantae
- Clade: Embryophytes
- Clade: Tracheophytes
- Clade: Angiosperms
- Clade: Eudicots
- Order: Ranunculales
- Family: Menispermaceae
- Genus: Orthomene; Barneby & Krukoff

= Orthomene =

Genus of plants

Orthomene is a genus of flowering plants belonging to the family Menispermaceae.

Its native range is Panama to Southern Tropical America and Trinidad.

== Species ==
Species:

- Orthomene hirsuta (Krukoff & Moldenke) Barneby & Krukoff
- Orthomene prancei Barneby & Krukoff
- Orthomene schomburgkii (Miers) Barneby & Krukoff
- Orthomene verruculosa (Krukoff & Barneby) Barneby & Krukoff
