= Cebatha =

Scientific classification
- Kingdom: Plantae
- Clade: Tracheophytes
- Clade: Angiosperms
- Clade: Eudicots
- Order: Ranunculales
- Family: Menispermaceae
- Genus: Cebatha; Forssk. (1775)

Species
- Cebatha balfourii (Schweinf. ex Balf.f.) Kuntze; Cebatha pendula (J.R.Forst. & G.Forst.) Kuntze

Synonyms
- Adenocheton Fenzl (1844); Bricchettia Pax (1897); Epibaterium J.R.Forst. & G.Forst. (1776), nom. rej.; Leaeba Forssk. (1775)

Genus of flowering plants

Cebatha is a genus of flowering plants in the moonseed family, Menispermaceae. It includes two species of shrubs or lianas native to Africa, the Arabian Peninsula, Iran, and the Indian subcontinent.

- Cebatha balfourii (Schweinf. ex Balf.f.) Kuntze – southwestern Oman, north-central Socotra, and southeastern Yemen
- Cebatha pendula (J.R.Forst. & G.Forst.) Kuntze – Cabo Verde to Angola and central India
