= Leptoterantha =

Scientific classification
- Kingdom: Plantae
- Clade: Tracheophytes
- Clade: Angiosperms
- Clade: Eudicots
- Order: Ranunculales
- Family: Menispermaceae
- Genus: Leptoterantha; Louis ex Troupin
- Species: L. mayumbensis

Binomial name
- Leptoterantha mayumbensis (Exell) Troupin

Genus of plants

Leptoterantha is a monotypic genus of flowering plants belonging to the family Menispermaceae. The only species is Leptoterantha mayumbensis.

Its native range is Western Central Tropical Africa.
