= Burasaia =

Scientific classification
- Kingdom: Plantae
- Clade: Tracheophytes
- Clade: Angiosperms
- Clade: Eudicots
- Order: Ranunculales
- Family: Menispermaceae
- Genus: Burasaia; Thouars

Genus of flowering plants

Burasaia is a genus of flowering plants belonging to the family Menispermaceae.

Its native range is Madagascar.

Species:

- Burasaia australis Elliot
- Burasaia congesta Decne.
- Burasaia gracilis Decne.
- Burasaia madagascariensis DC.
