= Strychnopsis =

Scientific classification
- Kingdom: Plantae
- Clade: Tracheophytes
- Clade: Angiosperms
- Clade: Eudicots
- Order: Ranunculales
- Family: Menispermaceae
- Genus: Strychnopsis; Baill.
- Species: S. thouarsii

Binomial name
- Strychnopsis thouarsii Baill.

Genus of plants

Strychnopsis is a monotypic genus of flowering plants belonging to the family Menispermaceae. The only species is Strychnopsis thouarsii.

Its native range is Madagascar.
