= Ungulipetalum =

Scientific classification
- Kingdom: Plantae
- Clade: Tracheophytes
- Clade: Angiosperms
- Clade: Eudicots
- Order: Ranunculales
- Family: Menispermaceae
- Genus: Ungulipetalum; Moldenke

Genus of flowering plant

Ungulipetalum is a monotypic genus of flowering plants belonging to the family Menispermaceae. The only species in this genus is Ungulipetalum filipendulum (Mart.) Moldenke. Its native range is Southeastern Brazil.
