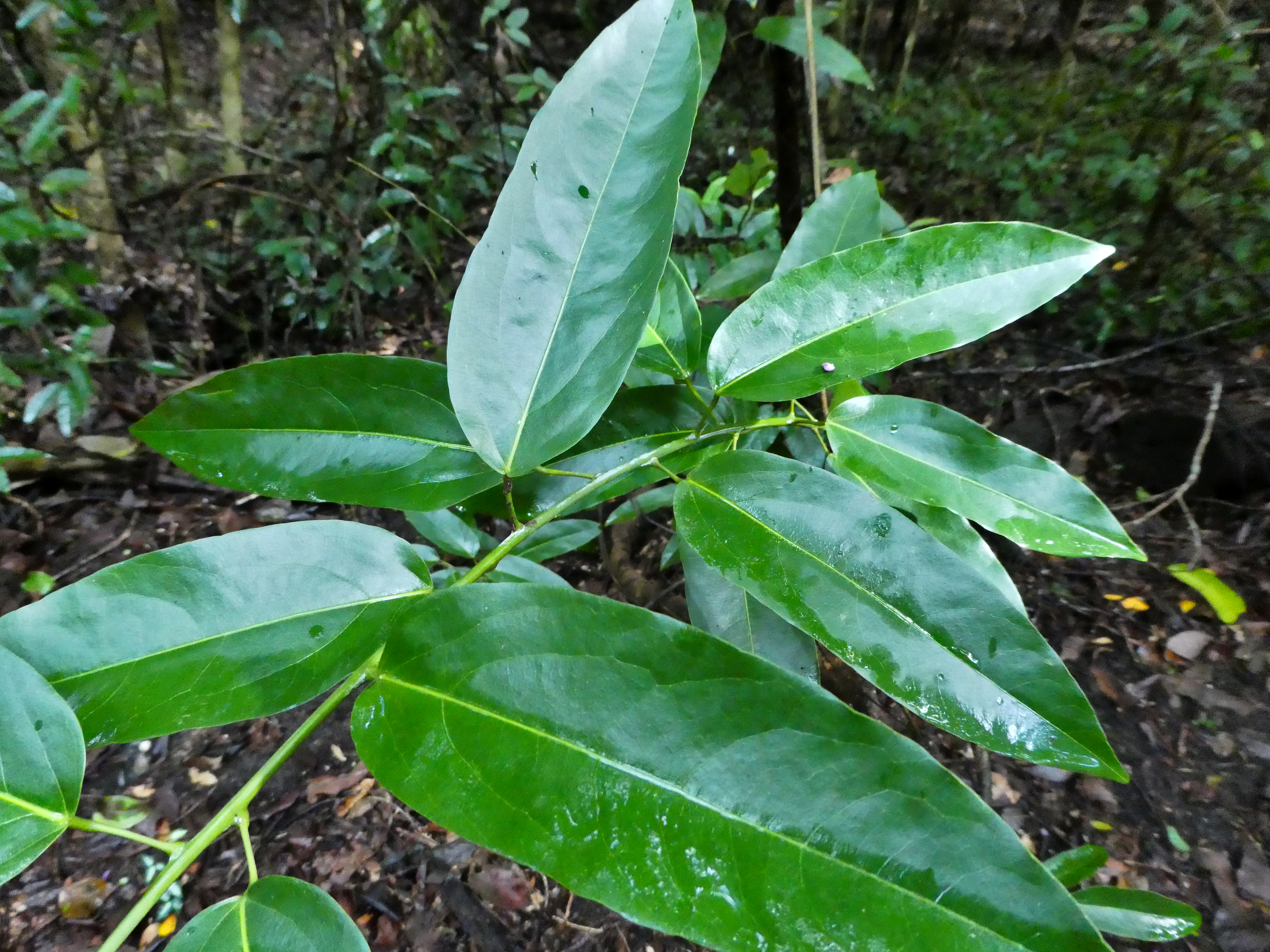
- In swamp forest

Conservation status
- Least Concern (NCA)

Scientific classification
- Kingdom: Plantae
- Clade: Tracheophytes
- Clade: Angiosperms
- Clade: Eudicots
- Order: Ranunculales
- Family: Menispermaceae
- Genus: Parapachygone; Forman
- Species: P. longifolia

Binomial name
- Parapachygone longifolia (F.M.Bailey) Forman

= Parapachygone =

Genus of flowering plants

Parapachygone is a genus of flowering plants belonging to the family Menispermaceae that is endemic to Queensland, Australia. It contains just one species, Parapachygone longifolia.

== Description ==
Parapachygone longifolia is a vine that may reach up to 3 cm (1.2 in) stem diameter. The leaves are glossy green and arranged alternately along the branches. They measure up to 30 cm (12 in) long by 17 cm (6.7 in) wide, and are carried on petiole (botany)s up to 5 cm (2.0 in) long. The petiole attaches to the underside of the leaf blade just inside the leaf margin, and there are six to nine pairs of lateral veins on either side of the midrib. The leaf blade is somewhat oblong in shape, with a rounded or obtuse base and a pointed tip.

This species is dioecious, meaning that pistillate (functionally female) and staminate (functionally male) flowers are borne on separate plants. The 'male' flowers are about 4 mm (0.16 in) diameter and occur in panicles which emerge from the leaf axils. 'Female' flowers are about 5 mm (0.20 in) diameter. The fruit is a red drupe about 2.5 cm (0.98 in) diameter, containing a single seed that is shaped something like a nautilus shell.

== Distribution and habitat ==
It inhabits rainforest in coastal parts of Queensland, from Cape Tribulation south to about Lucinda. The altitudinal range is from near sea level to about 750 m (2,460 ft).

== Conservation ==
This species is listed as least concern under the Queensland Government's Nature Conservation Act. As of April 2026, it has not been assessed by the International Union for Conservation of Nature.

== Taxonomy ==
This plant was first described as Pachygone longifolia in 1899 by Australian botanist Frederick Manson Bailey in his book The Queensland Flora. The description was based on material collected by "W. Mugford" from Mourilyan Harbour. This name was accepted up until 2007, when Lewis Leonard Forman reviewed the Australian members of Menispermaceae in the newly-published Flora of Australia, and transferred the species to the new genus Parapachygone.
