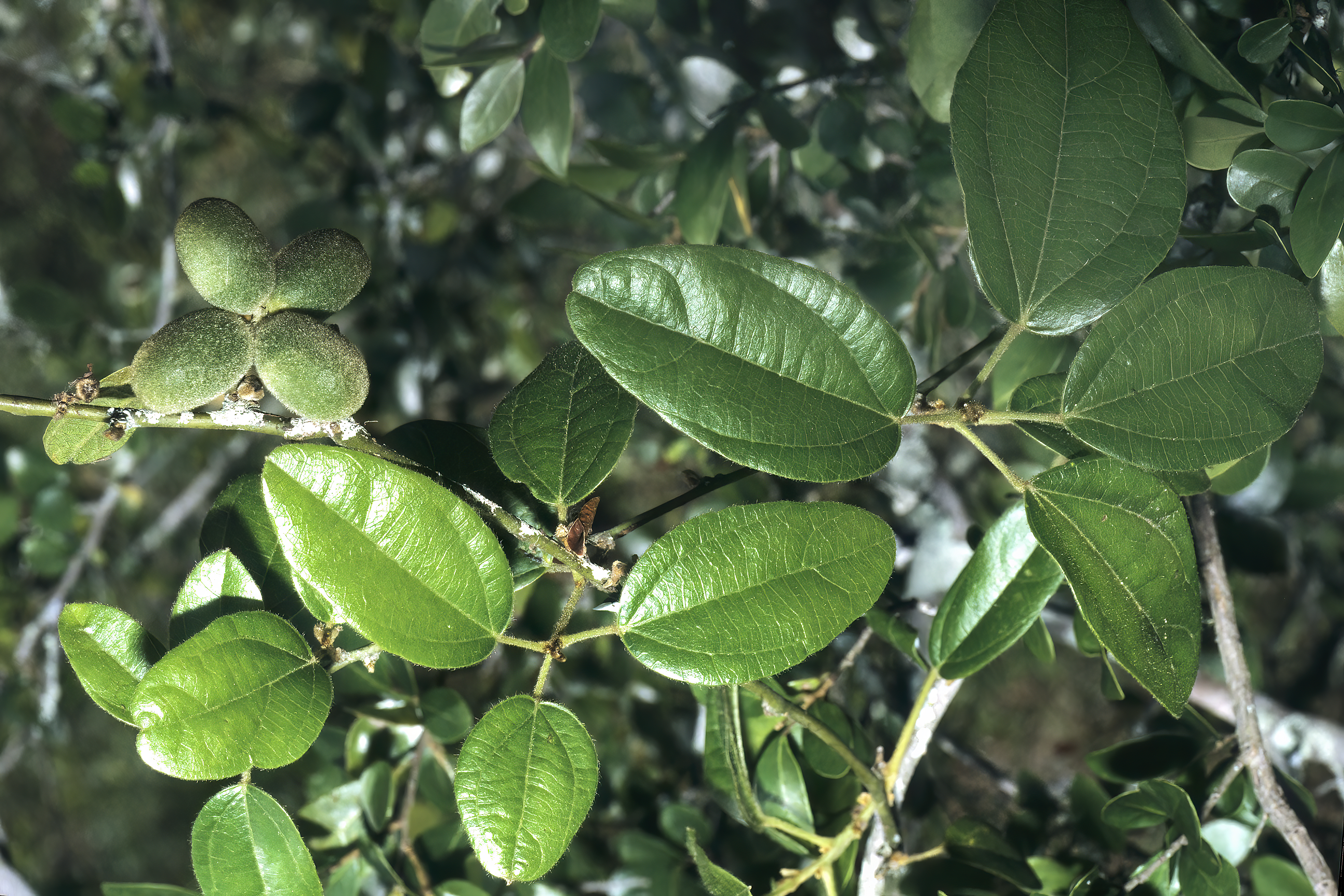
- Albertisia delagoensis

Scientific classification
- Kingdom: Plantae
- Clade: Tracheophytes
- Clade: Angiosperms
- Clade: Eudicots
- Order: Ranunculales
- Family: Menispermaceae
- Genus: Albertisia; Becc.

Synonyms
- Epinetrum Hiern; Junodia Pax

= Albertisia =

Genus of flowering plants

Albertisia is a genus of flowering plants belonging to the family Menispermaceae. Its native range is tropical and southern Africa, and tropical and subtropical Asia.

As of April 2026, Plants of the World Online accepts the following 22 species:

- Albertisia apiculata (Troupin) Forman
- Albertisia badia Breteler
- Albertisia capituliflora (Diels) Forman
- Albertisia cordifolia (Mangenot & Miege) Forman
- Albertisia crassa Forman
- Albertisia cuneata (Keay) Forman
- Albertisia delagoensis (N.E.Br.) Forman
- Albertisia exelliana (Troupin) Forman
- Albertisia ferruginea (Diels) Forman
- Albertisia glabra (Diels ex Troupin) Forman
- Albertisia laurifolia Yamam.
- Albertisia mangenotii (Guillaumet & Debray) Forman
- Albertisia mecistophylla (Miers) Forman
- Albertisia megacarpa Diels ex Forman
- Albertisia mouilaensis Breteler
- Albertisia papuana Becc.
- Albertisia porcata Breteler
- Albertisia puberula Forman
- Albertisia scandens (Mangenot & Miege) Forman
- Albertisia triplinervis Forman
- Albertisia undulata (Hiern) Forman
- Albertisia villosa (Exell) Forman
