= Macrophragma =

Scientific classification
- Kingdom: Plantae
- Clade: Tracheophytes
- Clade: Angiosperms
- Clade: Eudicots
- Order: Ranunculales
- Family: Menispermaceae
- Subfamily: Menispermoideae
- Tribe: Tiliacoreae
- Genus: Macrophragma; Pierre ex L.Lian & Wei Wang
- Species: M. jollyanum

Binomial name
- Macrophragma jollyanum (Pierre) L.Lian & Wei Wang

Synonyms
- Anisocycla jollyana (Pierre) Diels; Glossopholis jollyana Pierre (1898) (basionym)

Genus of flowering plants

Macrophragma is a genus of flowering plants in the family Menispermaceae. It includes a single species, Macrophragma jollyanum, a subshrub or shrub native to Cameroon, Republic of the Congo, Democratic Republic of the Congo, Equatorial Guinea, and Gabon in west-central tropical Africa.

The species was first described as Glossopholis jollyana by Jean Baptiste Louis Pierre in 1898. In 2023 Lian Lian and Wei Wang placed the species in the newly-described monotypic genus Macrophragma as Macrophragma jollyanum.
