= Anisocycla =

Scientific classification
- Kingdom: Plantae
- Clade: Tracheophytes
- Clade: Angiosperms
- Clade: Eudicots
- Order: Ranunculales
- Family: Menispermaceae
- Subfamily: Menispermoideae
- Tribe: Tiliacoreae
- Genus: Anisocycla; Baill.

Genus of flowering plants

Anisocycla is a genus of flowering plants in the family Menispermaceae. It includes three species of lianas and climbing shrubs native to southeastern tropical Africa (Tanzania, Mozambique, and Zimbabwe) and Madagascar.

- Anisocycla blepharosepala Diels
- Anisocycla grandidieri Baill.
- Anisocycla linearis Pierre ex Diels
