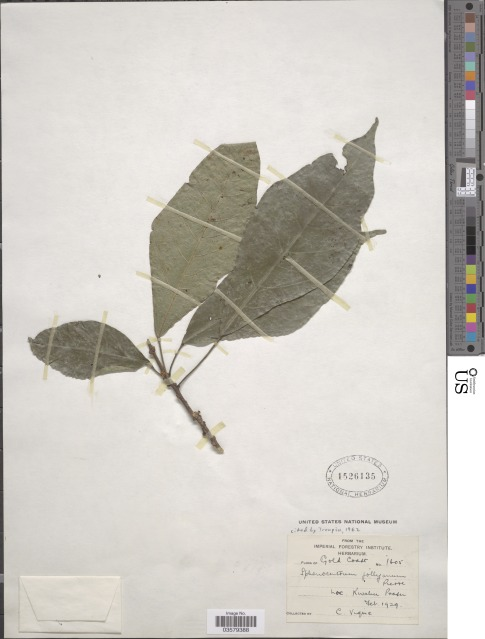
- Sphenocentrum jollyanum

Scientific classification
- Kingdom: Plantae
- Clade: Tracheophytes
- Clade: Angiosperms
- Clade: Eudicots
- Order: Ranunculales
- Family: Menispermaceae
- Genus: Sphenocentrum; Pierre
- Species: S. jollyanum

Binomial name
- Sphenocentrum jollyanum Pierre

= Sphenocentrum =

Genus of plants

Sphenocentrum is a monotypic genus of flowering plants belonging to the family Menispermaceae. The only species is Sphenocentrum jollyanum.

Its native range is Western Tropical Africa to Nigeria.
