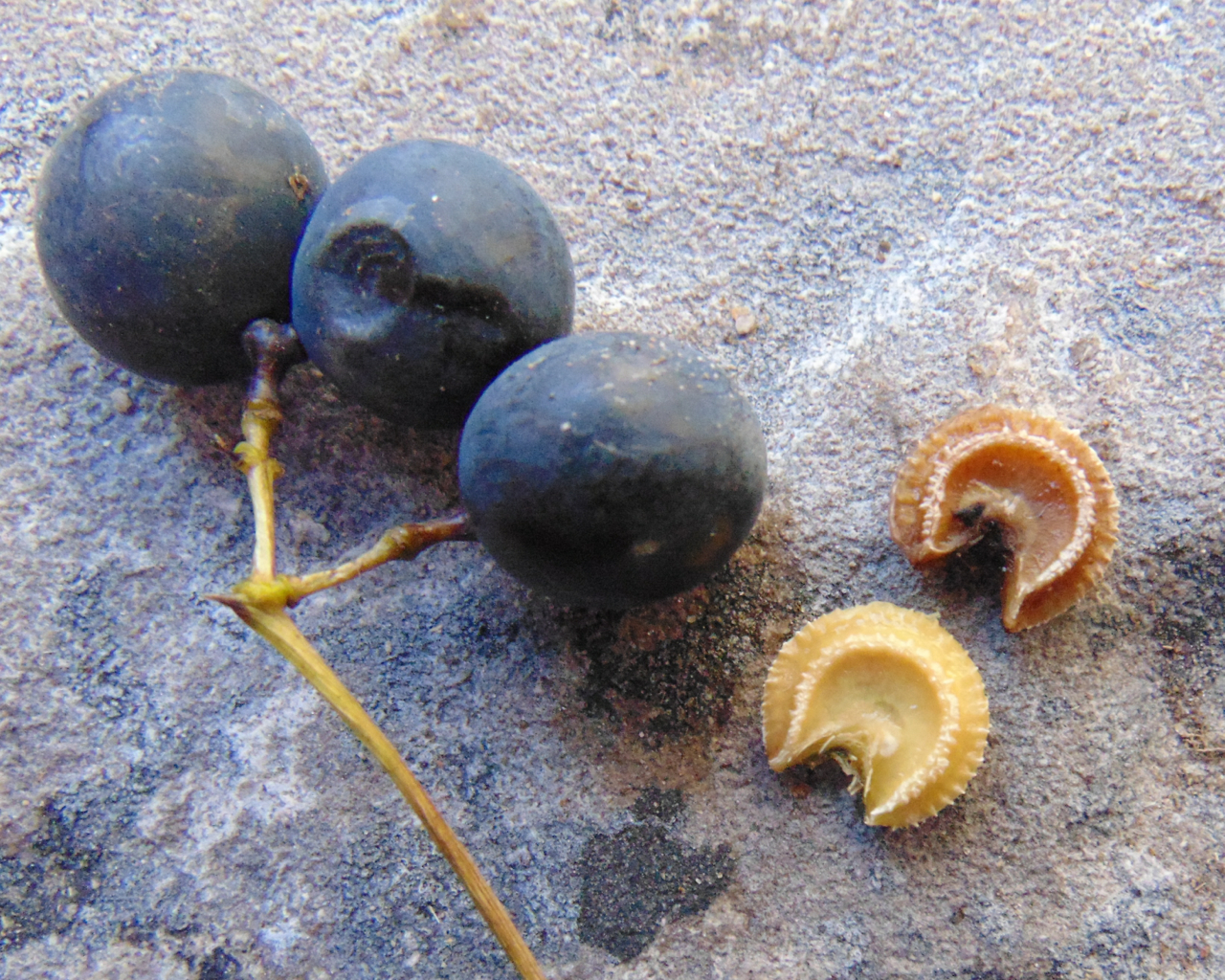
- Menispermum canadense

Scientific classification
- Kingdom: Plantae
- Clade: Embryophytes
- Clade: Tracheophytes
- Clade: Spermatophytes
- Clade: Angiosperms
- Clade: Eudicots
- Order: Ranunculales
- Family: Menispermaceae; Juss.

Genera
- 81, see text

= Menispermaceae =

Menispermaceae Temporal range: Cenomanian–Present

Family of flowering plants

Menispermaceae (botanical Latin: 'moonseed family' from Greek mene 'crescent moon' and sperma 'seed') is a family of flowering plants. The alkaloid tubocurarine, a neuromuscular blocker and the active ingredient in the 'tube curare' form of the dart poison curare, is derived from the South American liana Chondrodendron tomentosum, which belongs to this family. Several other South American genera belonging to the family have been used to prepare the 'pot' and 'calabash' forms of curare. The family contains 81 genera with some 440 species, which are distributed throughout low-lying tropical areas with some species present in temperate and arid regions.

== Description ==
Menispermaceae are rapidly growing, twining, ever-growing, and woody climbing plants. Rarely, they are upright shrubs, small trees, herbaceous plants or epiphytes (Stephania cyanantha). They can be perennial or deciduous, and have simple to uni-serrate hairs.

They usually wind anti-clockwise, although Stephania winds clockwise.

The leaves are alternating, or arranged in a spiral. The leaves can be simple, dentate, entire, or lobed. In Syntriandrium, the leaves are bi- or trifoliate. Leaves are frequently peltate, have stems, and lack stipules. The stipules sometimes form spines, as in Antizoma. The leaves are usually bifacial, though they are isofacial in Antizoma. The leaf venation can be almost parallel, or curved.

Arcangelisia and Anamirta have hydathodes derived from trichomes. Domatia are present in five genera as pits or hair tufts. Menispermaceae have various types of stomata, which are frequently cyclocytic. Phylloclades are present in Cocculus balfourii.

The plants are usually unisexual and dioecious. Tiliacora acuminata and Parabaena tend to have bisexual flowers. Inflorescences are sometimes racemiform, may be derived from a thyrse with partial inflorescences, and are sometimes paniculate. The inflorescences have multiple flowers, or rarely single or paired flowers. Flowers may be axillary, or cauliflorous. The female specimens are often less branched. The flowers are small, and regular or slightly irregular (Antizoma, Cyclea, Cissampelos have irregular flowers). They may be cyclic to irregularly spiral.

The receptacle has a developed gynophore. Sepals and petals are in whorls of three or six. There are three to twelve (or more) sepals, which are free or slightly fused, and are imbricate or valvate. Petals are similar, though they may be less numerous (often zero to six). The stamens are free of the perianth, free or fused together in 2–5, fasciculate or monadelphous, and introrse.

The dehiscence is along longitudinal, oblique or transversal slits. The female flowers are sometimes with staminodes. The fruitlets are always apocarpous. They may be superior, have three to six carpels, and are usually oppositipetalous.

The stigma are apical, dry, and papillous. There are two ovules per carpel, which are anatropous to campilotropous, uni- or bitegmic. The superior is epitropous and fertile, and the inferior apotropous and abortive, and placentation is marginal ventral. Male flowers sometimes have carpelodes.

The fruits (usually stipitate drupes) are compound. Each unit is straight or flattened, and asymmetric. The exocarp is usually leathery, and the mesocarp may be thin and fibrous fleshy, or juicy. The endocarp is woody to petrous, rough, tuberous, echinate or ribbed, and often has an outgrowth in the placenta called a condyle.

The seeds are spiral (in Limaciopsis and Spirospermum). The seeds may or may not have an endosperm. They are totally or only ventrally ruminate or not ruminate, and oleaginous. The embryo is straight or curved, with flat or cylindrical cotyledons. The cotyledons are leafy or fleshy, and often divaricate.

The pollen is tricolpate, with no operculum or ribs. The tectum is perreticulate. A columellate layer and granular endexine is present. The pollen can be colporate, as in Abuta, or syncolporate, as in Tinospora.

The chromosome number varies. Many, including Penianthus, Sphenocentrum, Tiliacora, Tinospora, and Stephania have thirteen pairs. Stephania japonica has eleven pairs. Cissampelos pareira has twenty-two pairs. Rhigiocarya racemifera has twelve pairs. Penianthus camerounensis, Menispermum, Sinomenium, and Cocculus are tetraploid, with fifty-two pairs of chromosomes. Cocculus carolinus and Cocculus orbiculatus are hexaploid.

== Ecology ==
It is thought that the cauliflorous species are pollinated by small bees, beetles or flies although there are no direct observations of this. Birds disperse the purple or black drupes, for example Sayornis phoebe (a tyrant flycatcher) eats the fruit of Cocculus. In Tinospora cordifolia a lapse of 6–8 weeks has been observed between fertilization and the first zygotic cell division.

The Menispermaceae predominantly inhabit low elevation tropical forests (up to 2,100m), where they are climbers, but some genera and species have adapted to arid locations (Antizoma species have adapted to the South African deserts or Cebatha balfourii and its phylloclades have adapted to the climate on the island of Socotra) and other temperate climates. C3 photosynthesis has been recorded in Menispermum.

== Phytochemistry ==
The family contains a wide range of benzylisoquinoline compounds (alkaloids) and lignans such as furofuran, flavones and flavonols and some proanthocyanidins.The most notable are the wide variety of alkaloids derived from benzyltetrahydroisoquinoline and aporphine, which accumulate as dimers, as well as the alkaloids derived from morphinan and from hasubanan and other diverse types of alkaloid such as derivative of aza-fluoranthene. Sesquiterpenes such as picrotoxin and diterpenes are also present, while the triterpenes are scarce, and where present are similar to oleanane. Ecdysone steroids have also been found. Some species are cyanogenic.

== Uses ==
The Menispermaceae have been used in traditional pharmacopeia and drugs have been formulated from these plants that are of great use in modern medicine. These drugs are based on alkaloids and include tubocurarine from curare, a poison used by indigenous South American tribes on their poison darts, that is obtained from species of Curarea, Chondrodendron, Sciadotenia, and Telitoxicum. A similar poison was used in Asia that was obtained from species of Anamirta, Tinospora, Coscinium, and Cocculus. Tubocurarine and its synthetic derivatives are used to relax muscles during surgical interventions. The roots of "kalumba" or "colombo" (Jateorhiza palmata) are used in Africa for stomach problems and against dysentery. Species of Tinospora are used in Asia as antipyretics, the fruit of Anamirta cocculus is used to poison fish and birds and the stems of Fibraurea are used to dye fabric yellow. The South East Asian species Coscinium fenestratum, a local Thai remedy for stomach ailments (which contains berberine and related alkaloids) was recently implicated in mass harvesting operations to prepare extracts usable as precursors in the manufacture of the drug MDMA.

== Fossil record ==
The Middle Cretaceous genus Callicrypta from Siberia has been placed into Menispermaceae. The Paleocene fossil record for the family includes at least 11 genera identified from compression leaf fossils found in Alaska and 15 genera and approximately 22 different Menispermaceae species identified from the Early Eocene London Clay. The London Clay genera Eohypserpa and Tinomiscoidea named by Reid & Chandler (1933) from mineralized nuts and additional three genera Atriaecarpum, Davisicarpum, and Palaeosinomenium were later described by Chandler (1961, 1978). Additional species from those genera were identified in the Clarno nut beds by Scott and Manchester respectively.

Menispermaceae is one of the most diverse families found in the Middle Eocene Clarno nut beds of central Oregon. Species belonging to thirteen different genera, mostly extinct, have been described based on cast or permineralized fruit and nut fossils from the beds, and four different foliage types are known from associated compression fossils. Chandlera and Odontocaryoideae were described by Scott (1954), while Manchester (1994) described Curvitinospora and Thanikaimonia.

== Phylogeny and internal classification ==
The APG IV system (2016; unchanged from the prior systems of 1998, 2003, and 2009) recognizes this family and places it with the eudicots order Ranunculales. Their trimerous flower structure is similar to the Lardizabalaceae and Berberidaceae, although they differ from them in other important characteristics. The APW (Angiosperm Phylogeny Website) considers that they form part of the Order Ranunculales, and that they are a sister group on the branch formed by the Lardizabalaceae and Berberidaceae families in a reasonably advanced clade of the order. Kinship with the Berberidaceae is further borne out by similarities in phytochemistry e.g. in the presence of berberine and related alkaloids. It is a medium-sized family of 78 genera totaling 420 extant species, mostly of climbing plants. The great majority of the genera are tropical, but with a few (notably Menispermum and Cocculus) reaching temperate climates in eastern North America and eastern Asia.

The genetic factors within Menispermaceae are very narrow resulting in many genera with one or a few species. According to Kessler (1993) there was not sufficient data from genetic studies to evaluate subfamily and tribal division into five tribes. As such, division was fundamentally based on morphologic characteristics of the seeds with doubts as to whether the tribes are monophyletic. Further molecular research compiled and conducted by the Angiosperm Phylogeny Group has clarified many of the interrelationships of the family.

=== Chasmantheroideae ===
Burasaieae

- Aspidocarya J. D. Hooker & Thomson
- Borismene Barneby
- Burasaia Thouars
- Calycocarpum Torrey & A. Gray
- Chasmanthera Hochst.
- †Chandlera Scott
- Chlaenandra Miquel
- Dialytheca Exell & Mendonça
- Dioscoreophyllum Engler
- Diploclisia Miers
- Disciphania Eichler
- Fibraurea Loureiro
- Hyalosepalum Troupin
- Jateorhiza Miers
- Kolobopetalum Engler
- Leptoterantha Troupin
- Odontocarya Miers (including Synandropus)
- Orthogynium Baillon
- Parabaena Miers
- Paratinospora Wei Wang
- Penianthus Miers
- Platytinospora (Engler) Diels
- Rhigiocarya Miers
- Sarcolophium Troupin
- Sphenocentrum Pierre
- Syntriandrium Engler
- Tinomiscium J. D. Hooker & Thomson
- Tinospora Miers (including Fawcettia F. Muell.)

Coscinieae

- Anamirta Colebrooke
- Arcangelisia Beccari
- Coscinium Colebrooke

=== Menispermoideae ===
Anomospermeae

- Abuta Aublet
- Anomospermum Miers
- Caryomene Barneby & Krukoff
- Diploclisia Miers
- Echinostephia (Diels) Domin
- Elephantomene Barneby & Krukoff (including Cionomene)
- Elissarrhena Miers
- Hypserpa Miers
- Legnephora Miers
- Orthomene Barneby & Krukoff
- Parapachygone Forman
- Pericampylus Miers
- Rupertiella Wei Wang & R. Ortiz
- Sarcopetalum F. Mueller
- Telitoxicum Moldenke

Cissampelidae

- Antizoma Miers
- Botryodiscia (Lour.) Lian Lian & Wei Wang
- Cissampelos L.
- Cyclea Wight
- Perichasma Miers
- Stephania Loureiro

Limacieae

- Limacia Loureiro

Menispermeae

- Menispermum L.
- Sinomenium Diels

Pachygoneae

- Cebatha Forssk.
- Cocculus de Candolle
- Haematocarpus Miers
- Hyperbaena Bentham
- Nephroia Lour.
- Pachygone Miers

Spirospermeae

- Limaciopsis Engler
- Rhaptonema Miers
- Spirospermum Thouars
- Strychnopsis Baillon

Tiliacoreae

- Albertisia Beccari
- Anisocycla Baillon
- Beirnaertia Troupin
- Carronia F. Mueller
- Chondrodendron Ruiz & Pavón
- Curarea Barneby & Krukoff
- Eleutharrhena Forman
- Georgesia L.Lian & Wei Wang
- Macrococculus Beccari
- Macrophragma Pierre ex L.Lian & Wei Wang
- Pleogyne Miers
- Pycnarrhena J. D. Hooker & Thomson
- Sciadotenia Miers
- Synclisia Bentham & J. D. Hooker
- Syrrheonema Miers
- Tiliacora Colebrooke
- Triclisia Bentham & J. D. Hooker
- Ungulipetalum Moldenke

Incertae sedis

- †Callicrypta

== Gallery ==
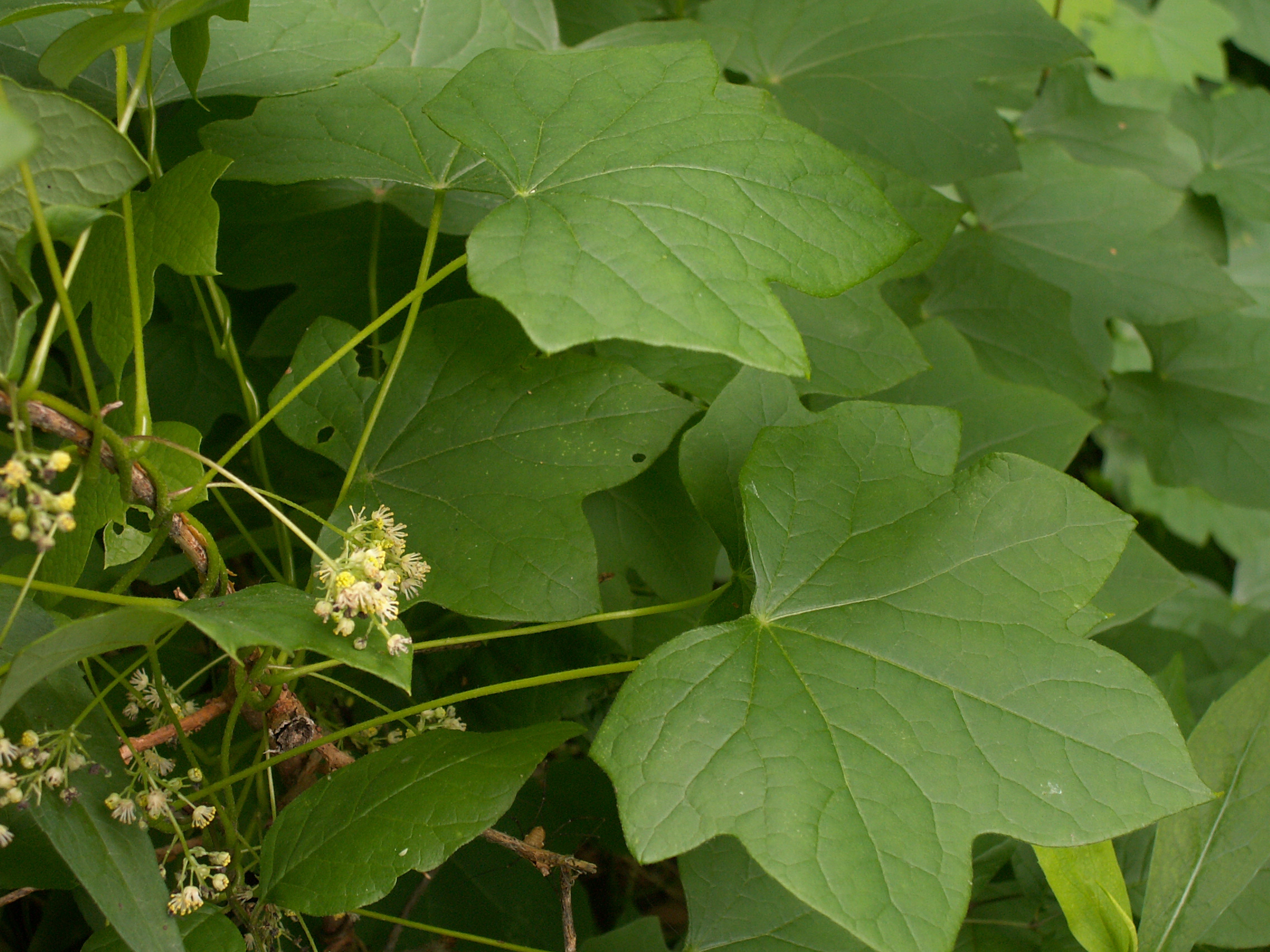
Menispermum canadense, foliage and flowers. Frick Park, Pittsburgh.

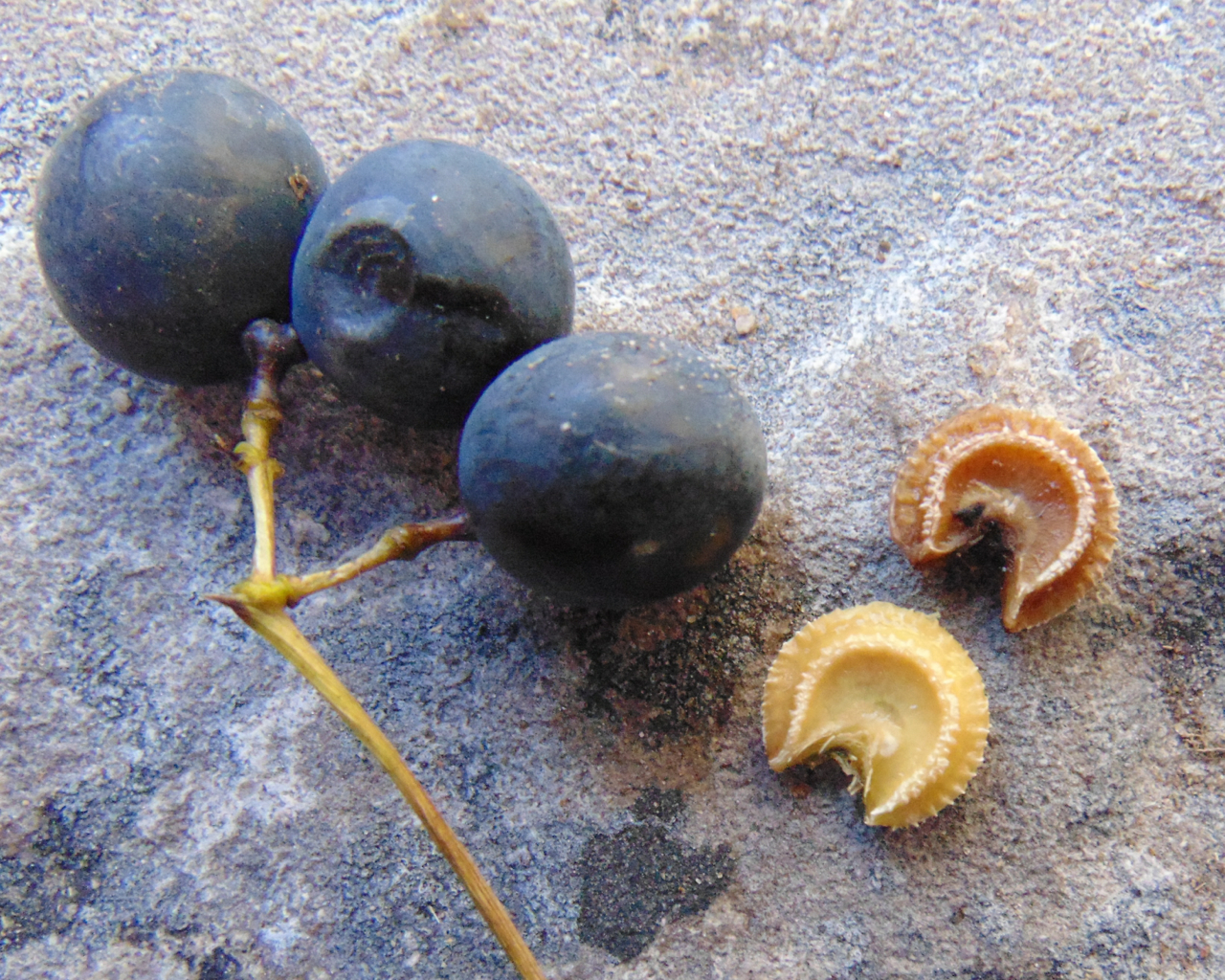
Menispermum canadense (Canada moonseed) : ripe fruit and crescent moon-shaped seeds.

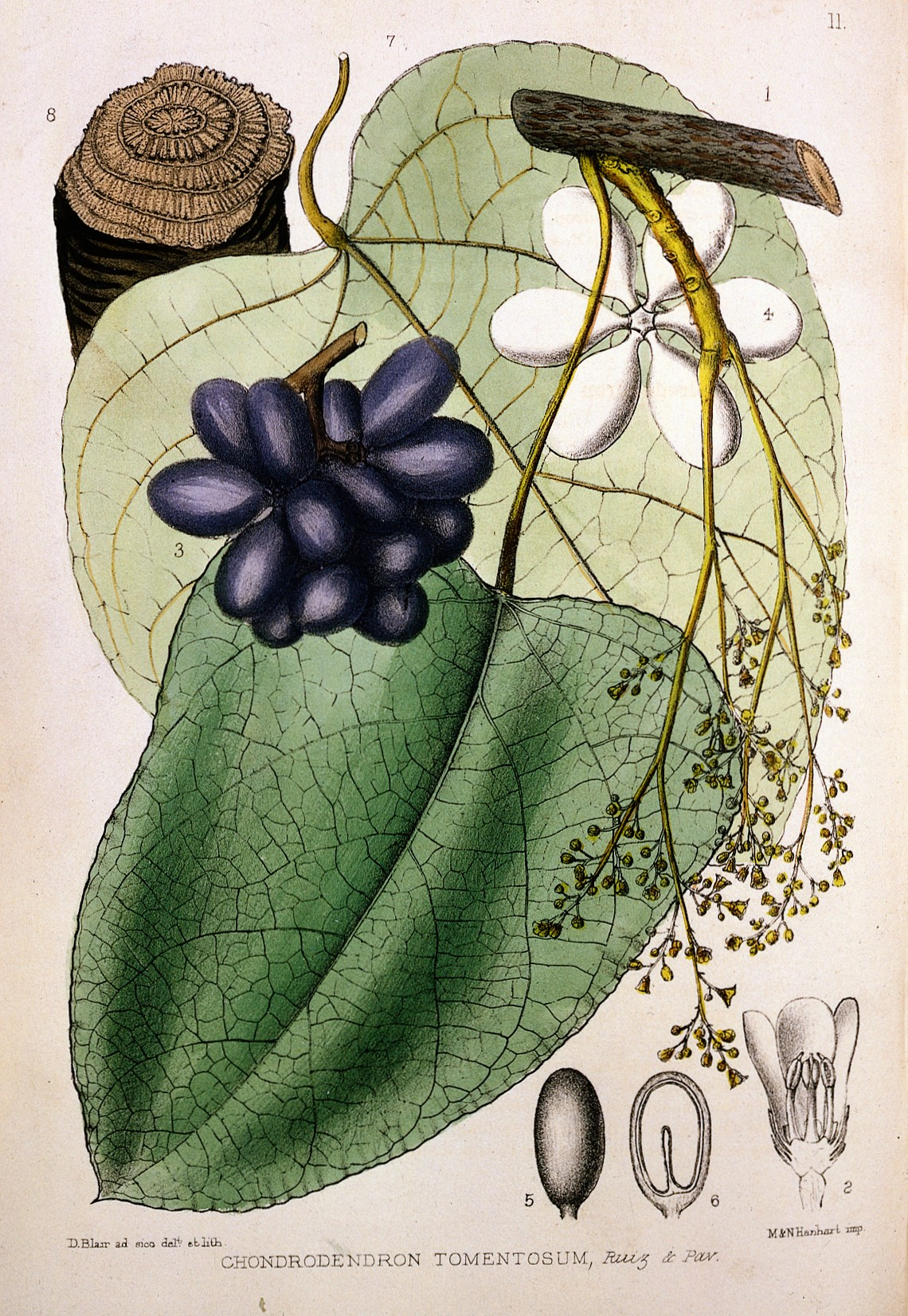
Chondrodendron tomentosum : Coloured plate from Bentley and Trimen's Medicinal Plants

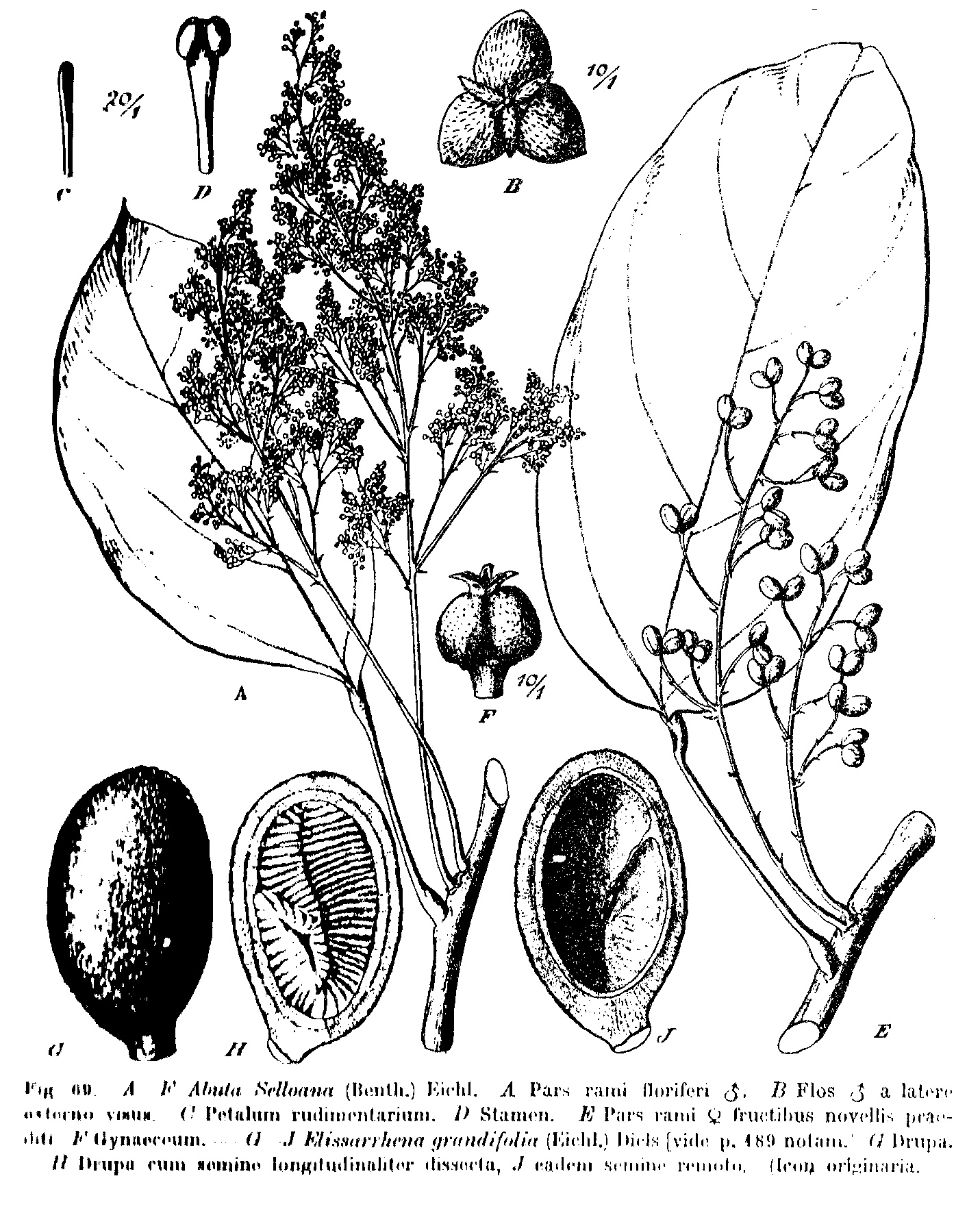
The Abuta species A. selloana : line drawing from Engler's Das Pflanzenreich.

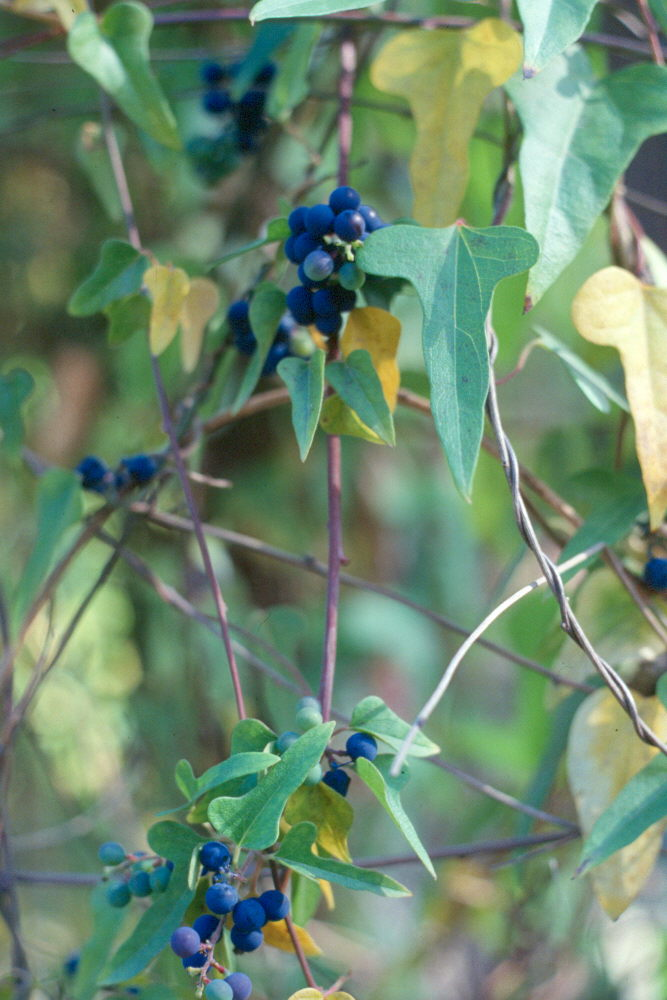
Cocculus orbiculatus in fruit. Real Jardín Botánico de Madrid.

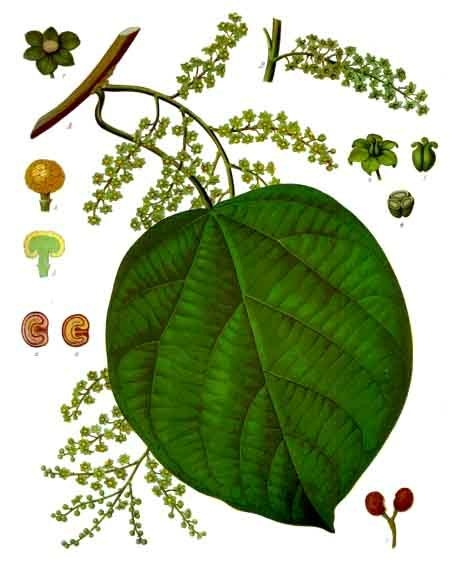
Anamirta cocculus : illustration from Köhler's Medizinal Pflanzen.

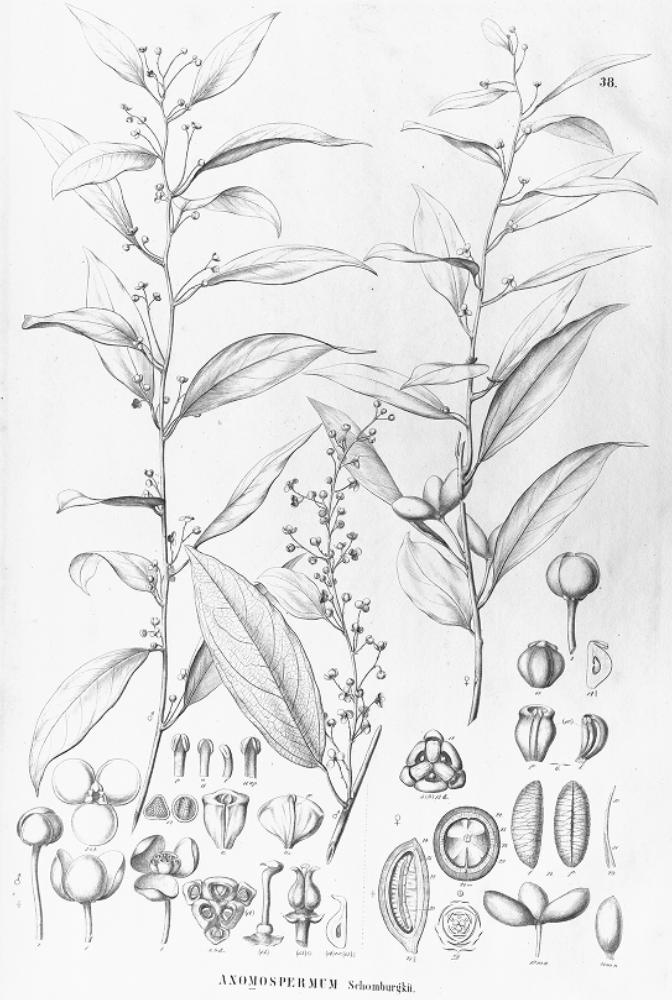
Anomospermum : A. schomburgkii : anatomical study from the Flora Brasiliensis of von Martius and Eichler.

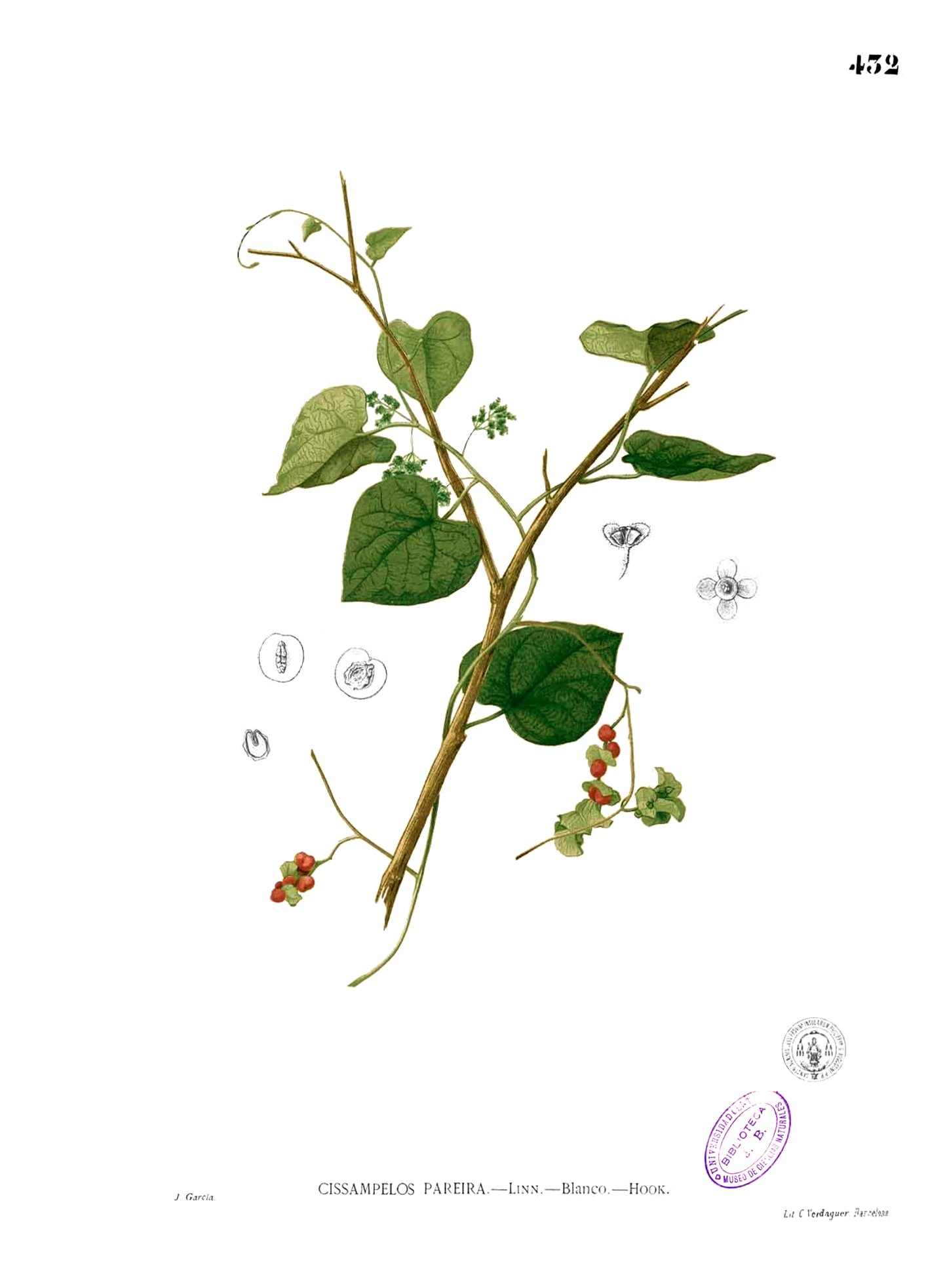
Cissampelos pareira: illustration from Blanco's Flora de Filipinas.

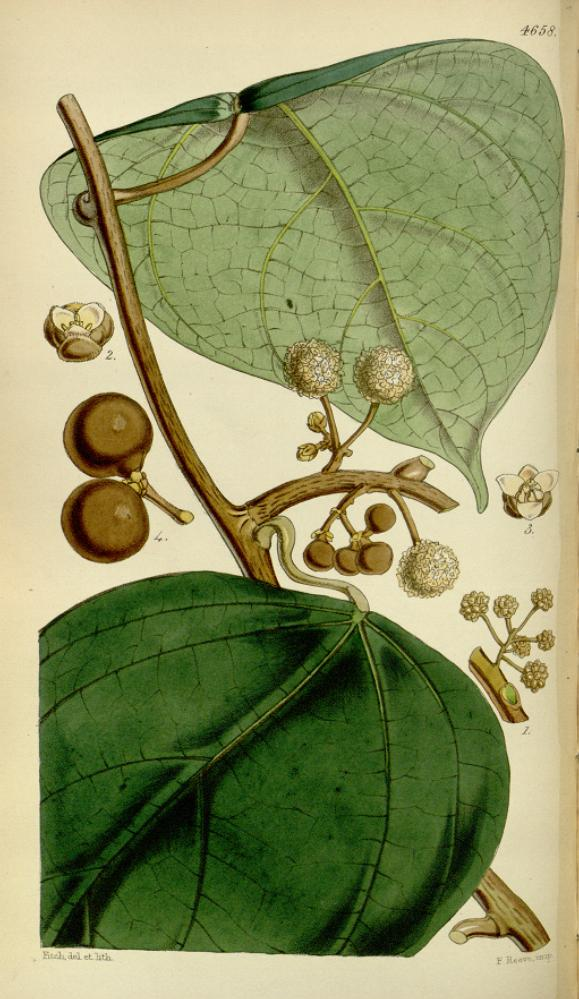
Coscinium fenestratum 'yellow vine' : plate from Curtis's Botanical Magazine.

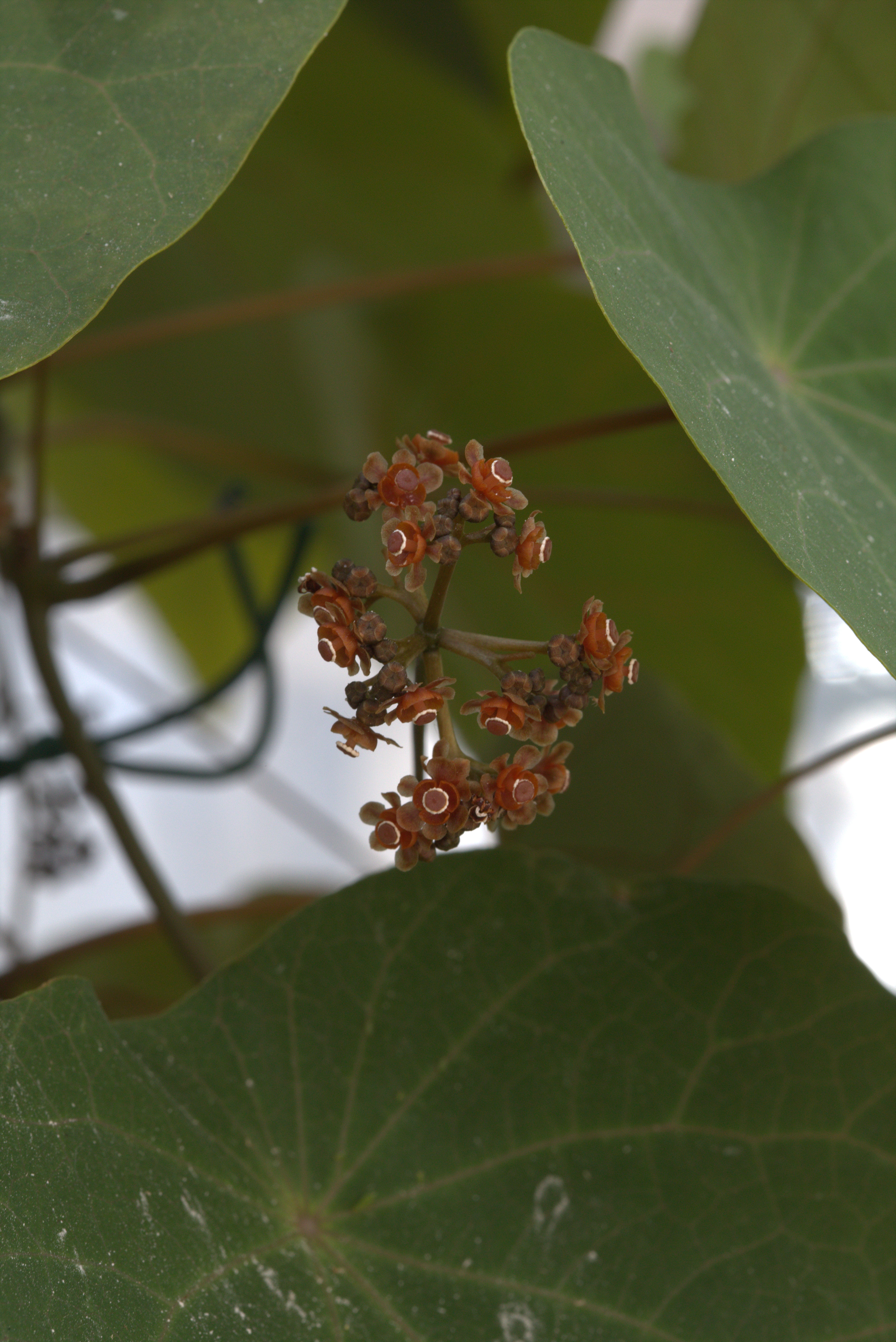
The Stephania species S. venosa in flower, Gothenburg Botanical Garden.

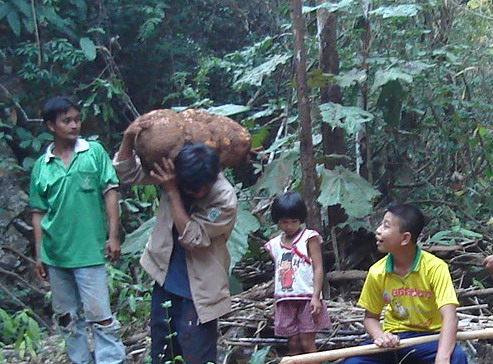
Thai villagers harvesting large, medicinal root tuber of Stephania venosa.

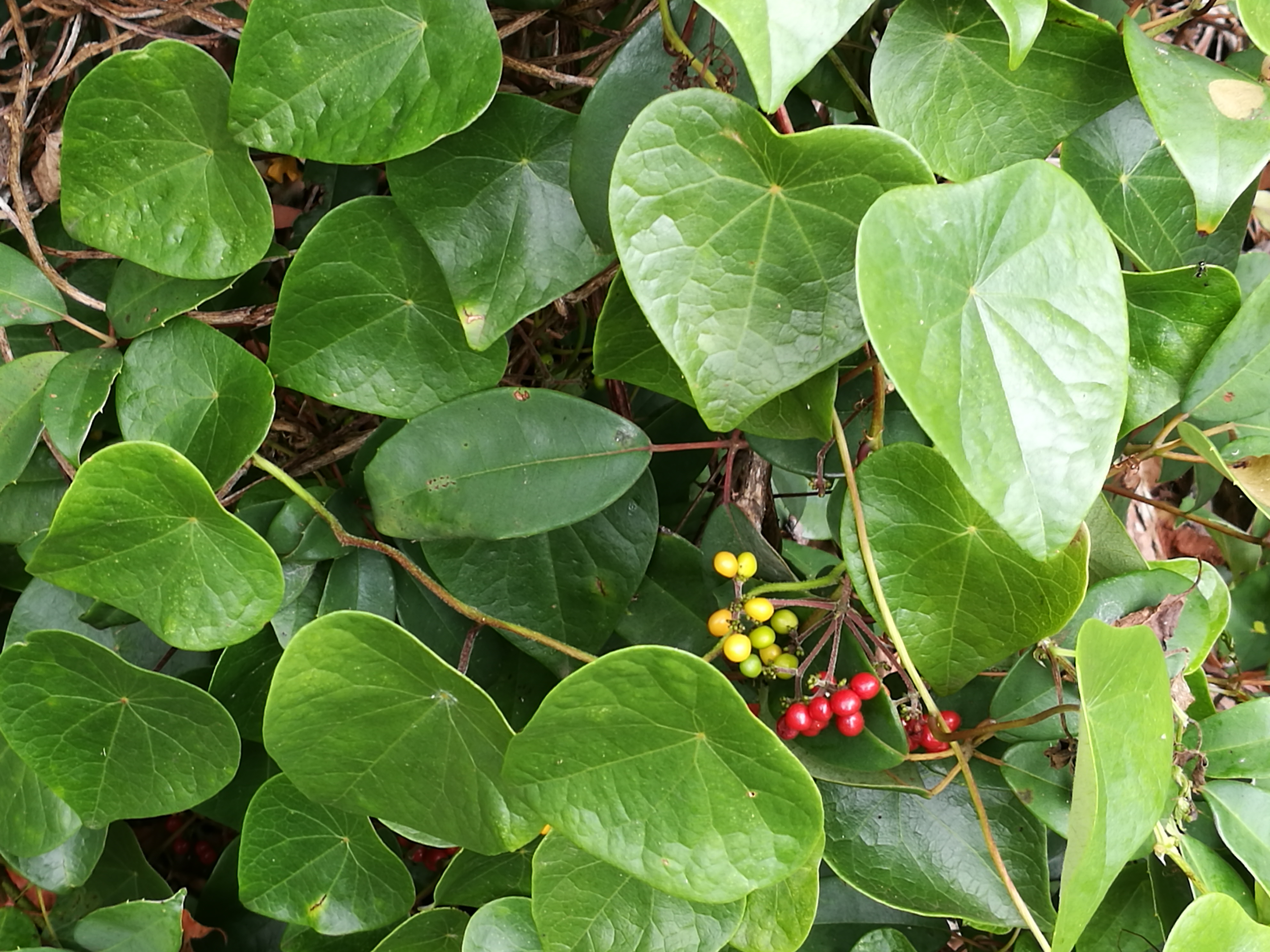
Stephania japonica in fruit, Mc.Kay Reserve, NSW, Australia.

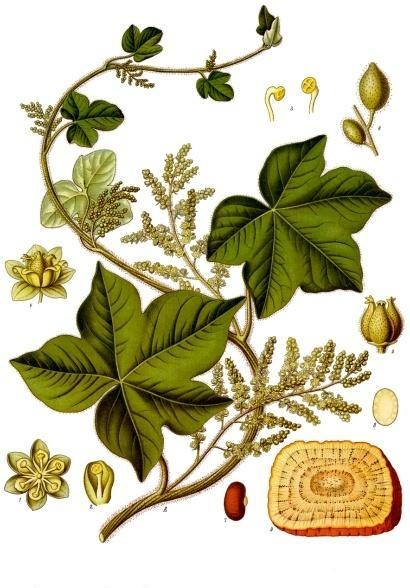
Jateorhiza palmata illustration from Köhler's Medizinal Pflanzen.

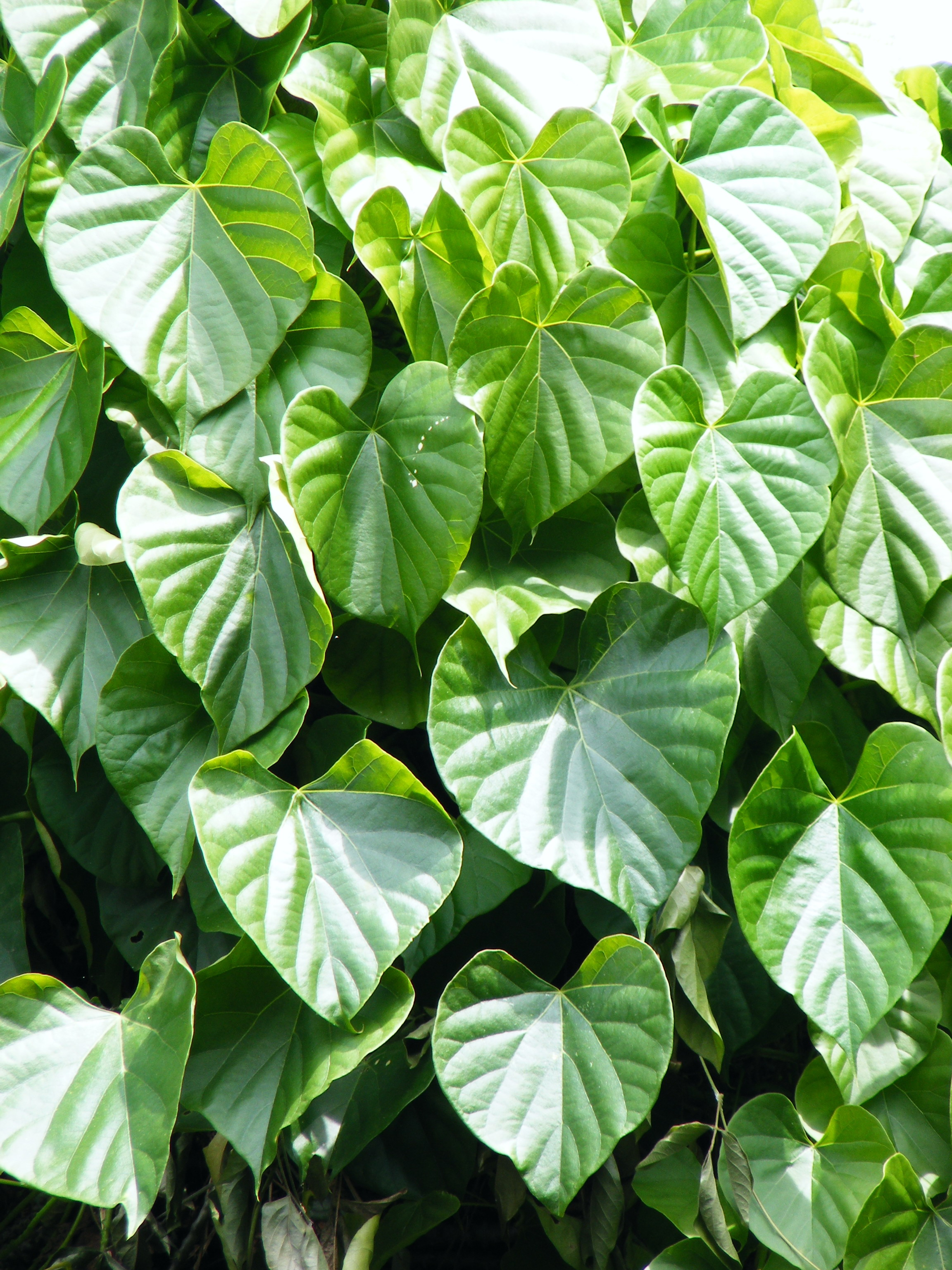
Foliage of Tinospora cordifolia.
