= John Miers (botanist) =

British botanist and engineer (1789-1879)

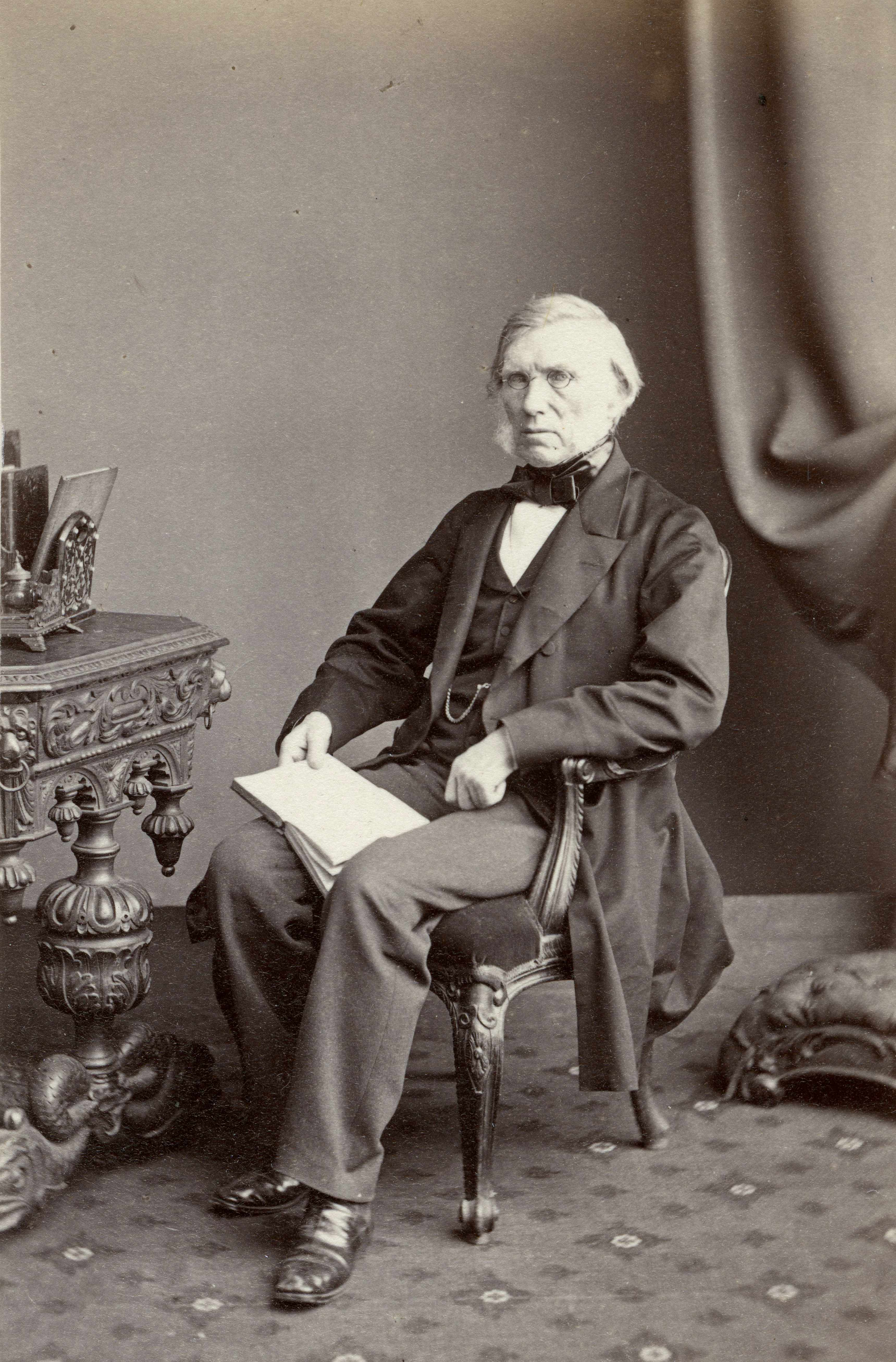
John Miers c. 1865

John Miers, FRS FLS (25 August 1789 – 17 October 1879. Kensington), was a British botanist and engineer, best known for his work on the flora of Chile and Argentina. He was awarded a knight grand cross of the Order of the Rose.

== Life and work ==
Miers was born in London to a jeweller from Yorkshire, and showed interest in mineralogy and chemistry from an early age. His first published work was a monograph on nitrogen which appeared in the Annals of Philosophy in 1814. After his marriage in 1818 he travelled to South America to participate in a venture to exploit the mineral resource of Chile, particularly copper. However, after landing in Buenos Aires his wife came down with childbed fever on the trip across country, and he decided not to continue to Chile, instead starting a study of the local flora, which at that time was largely unresearched.

In May 1819 Miers arrived in Santiago, Chile, having arranged the clandestine transport of coin presses, and settled at Concón, near Valparaíso. He developed business ventures with Lord Cochrane, then head of the Chilean Navy. They built a flour mill, developed plans for a ranch at Quintero, and intended becoming the major supplier of salt beef, biscuits and other supplies to the Navy

In 1825 he returned to England, and the following year published Travels in Chile and La Plata, the first of several works documenting the plants of South America. Towards the end of the decade he returned to Argentina to work on contracts with the Argentinian mint. Political instability ended this work in 1831 and he moved to Rio de Janeiro to fulfil a similar contract with the Brazilian government, returning to England in 1838. He was elected Fellow of the Linnean Society in 1838 and a Fellow of the Royal Society in 1843 and assisted in the editing of the papers of others, as well as editing his own. He served as a jury for the 1862 and 1867 exhibitions in Paris for which he was honored Commander of the Order of the Rose.

His most important work was Contributions to the Botany of South America (1870); other well-known works were On the Apocynaceae of South America (1878) and Illustrations of South American Plants (1789-1879). Several taxa are named in his honour.

In 1826, botanist John Lindley, published Miersia, a plant genus in the Amaryllidaceae. All ten known species are native to Chile and Bolivia. Then in 1903, botanist Ignatz Urban published a monotypic genus of flowering plants from South America, in the Burmanniaceae as Miersiella also in John Miers's honour.

Miers was the grandfather of Henry Alexander Miers 1858-1942.
