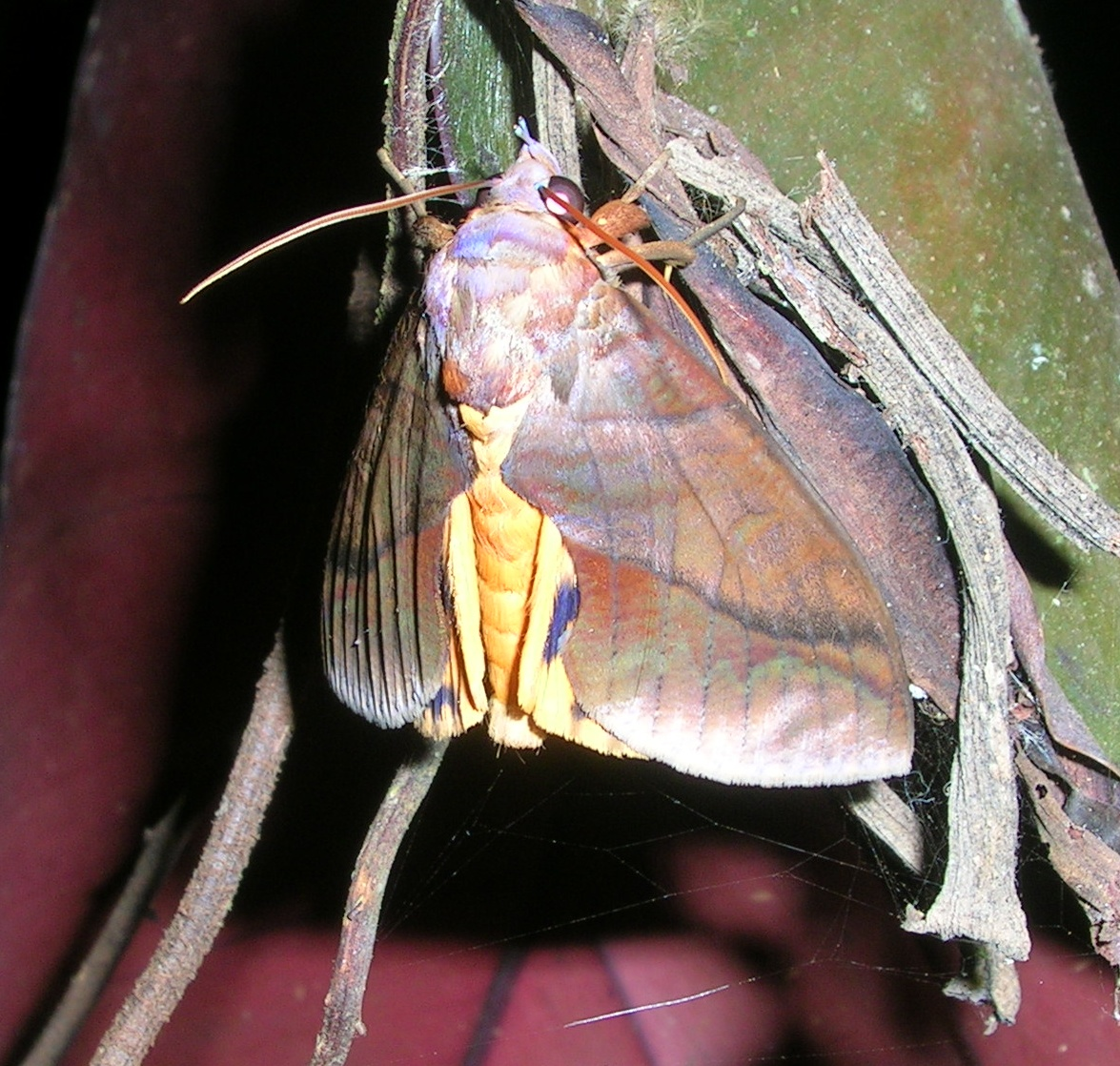
- Male in India

Scientific classification
- Kingdom: Animalia
- Phylum: Arthropoda
- Class: Insecta
- Order: Lepidoptera
- Superfamily: Noctuoidea
- Family: Erebidae
- Genus: Eudocima
- Species: E. phalonia

Binomial name
- Eudocima phalonia (Linnaeus, 1763)

Synonyms
- Othreis fullonica; Eudocima fullonia (Clerck, 1764); Phalaena phalonia Linnaeus, 1763; Phalaena fullonia Clerck, 1764; Phalaena fullonica Linnaeus, 1767; Noctua dioscoreae Fabricius, 1775; Phalaena pomona Cramer, 1776; Ophideres princeps Boisduval, 1832; Ophideres obliterans Walker, 1858

= Eudocima phalonia =

Common fruit-piercing moth

Species of moth

Eudocima phalonia, the common fruit-piercing moth, is a fruit piercing moth of the family Erebidae. The species was first described by Carl Linnaeus in his 1763 Centuria Insectorum. It is found in large parts of the tropics, mainly in Asia, Africa and Australia but introduced into other areas such as Hawaii, New Zealand and the Society Islands. It is one of major fruit pests in the world.

== Description ==
The wingspan is about 80–94 mm in male. Palpi with third joint long and spatulate at extremity. Forewings with non-crenulate cilia in male, crenulate in female. Head and thorax reddish brown with plum-color suffusion. Abdomen orange. Forewings reddish brown, usually with a greenish tinge and irrorated with dark specks. An oblique antemedial line present, which is generally dark and indistinct but sometimes pale and prominent. Reniform indistinct. A curve postmedial line found, which is almost always met by an oblique streak from apex. Hindwings orange, with a large black lunule beyond lower angle of cell. There is a marginal black band with cilia pale spots runs from costa to vein 2. Ventral side of forewings with orange postmedial band.

The wingspan is about 90–110 mm in female. Female has much more variegated and dark reddish brown striated forewings. Reniform dark and sending a spur along median nervure to below the orbicular speck. There is a triangular white mark usually present on the postmedial line below vein 3.

Larva has dilated 11th somite and surrounded by a tubercle. Body purplish brown, where dorsum brown from 6th to 11th somites. Legs red and spiracular scarlet patches largest posteriorly and with some irregular white markings round them, on somite 9 in the form of an oblique white bar. There is a yellow sub-basal mark found on 4th somite. Fifth and sixth somites have black ocelli with yellow iris and white pupils. Two yellow patches can be seen on 11th somite.

The adult is considered an agricultural pest, causing damage to many fruit crops by piercing it with its strong proboscis in order to suck the juice. Attempts have been made to control them using baits for the adults, egg parasites and larval parasitoids.

== Ecology ==
The larvae feed mainly on vines belonging to the Menispermaceae but have also adapted to species of Erythrina and are known to feed on Erythrina crista-galli, Erythrina fusca, Erythrina variegata, Carronia multisepala, Hypserpa decumbens, Legnephora moorei, Pleogyne australis, Sarcopetalum harveyanum, Stephania aculeata, Stephania forsteri, Stephania japonica and Tinospora smilacina.

Infected plant parts are mostly the fruits. Fruits show sap ooze out and internal feeding of the caterpillar. Fruits may show premature drop. Adults penetrate the skin or rind with a strong, barbed proboscis. Damaged parts become spongy and with many lesions.

== Gallery ==
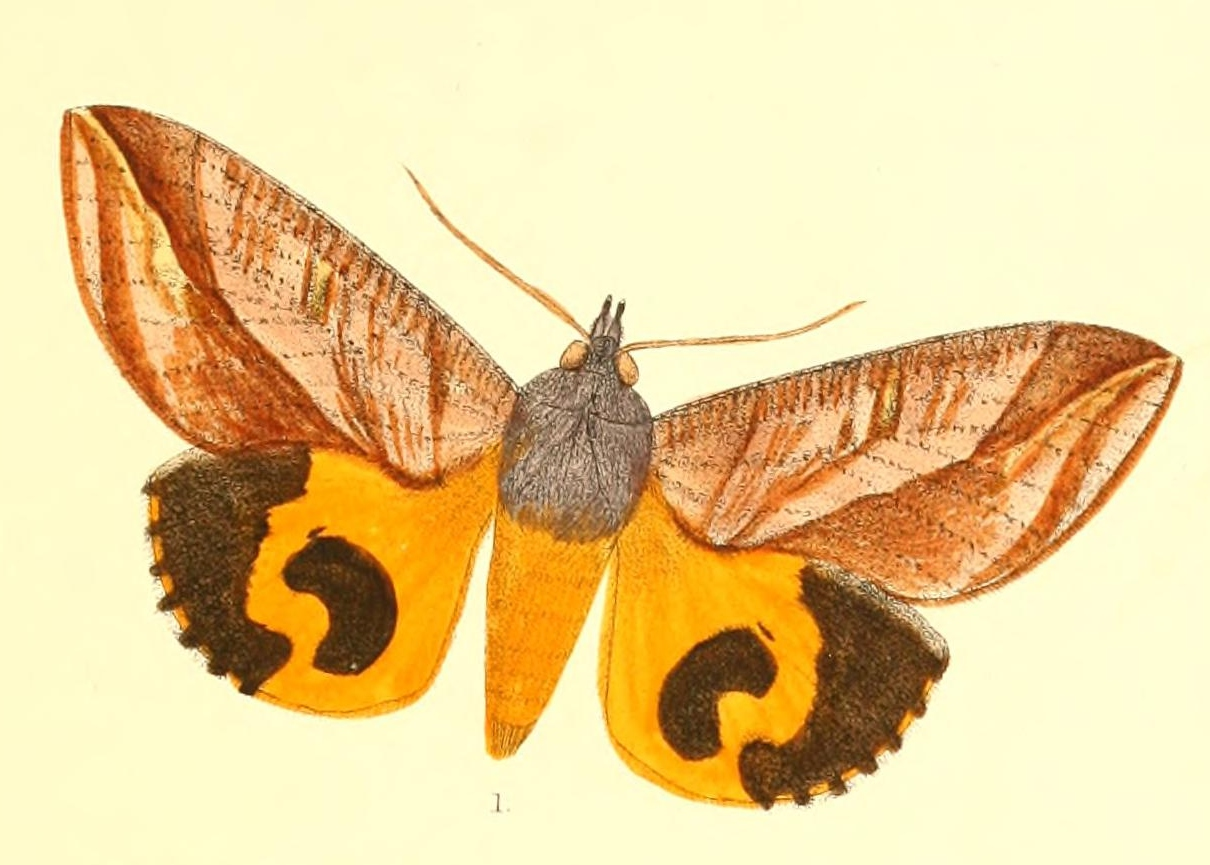
Male

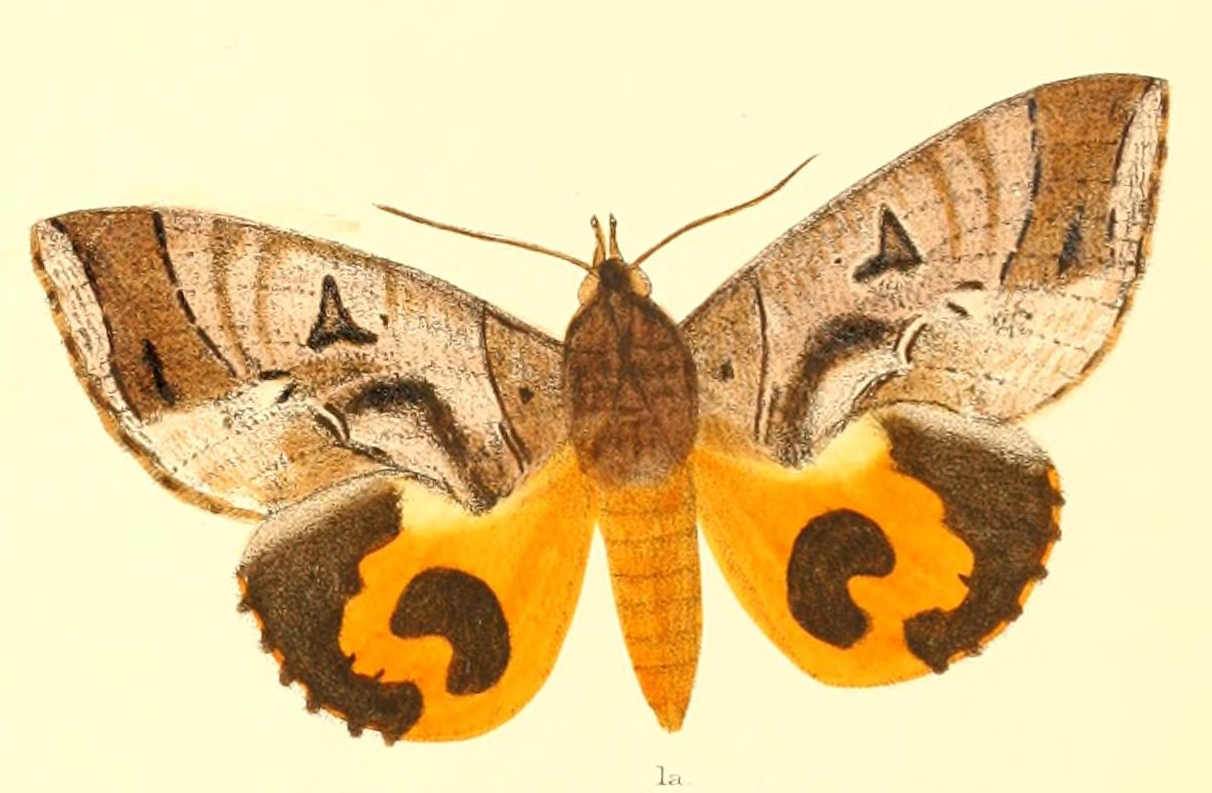
Female

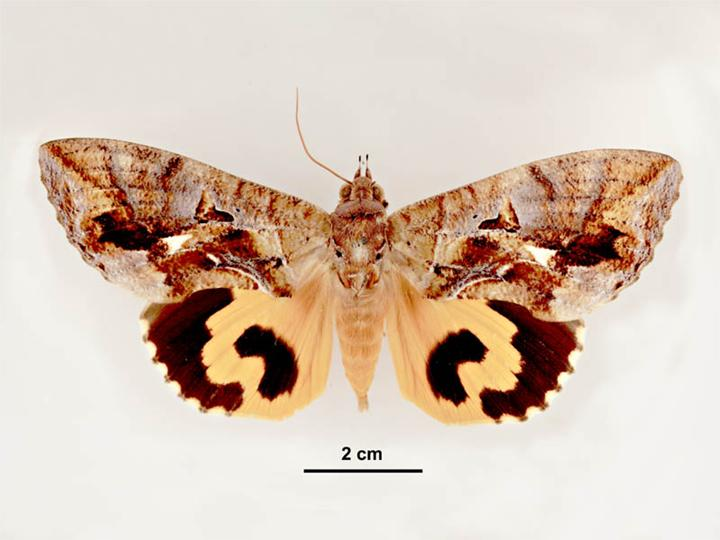
Female, dorsal view

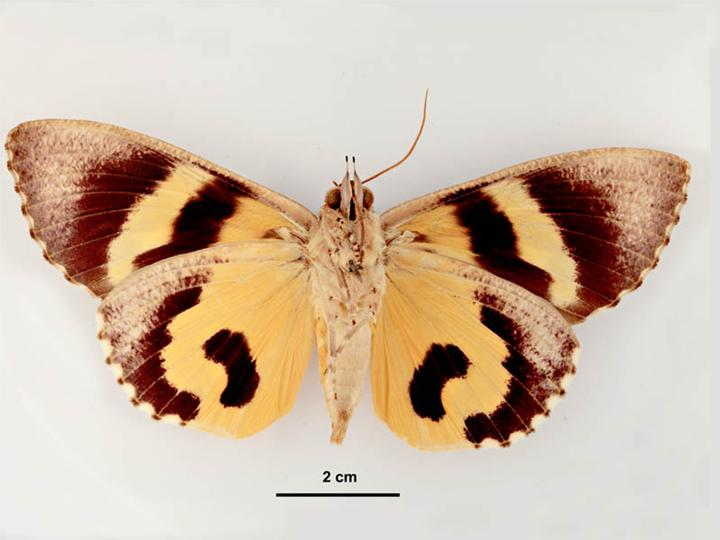
Female, ventral view

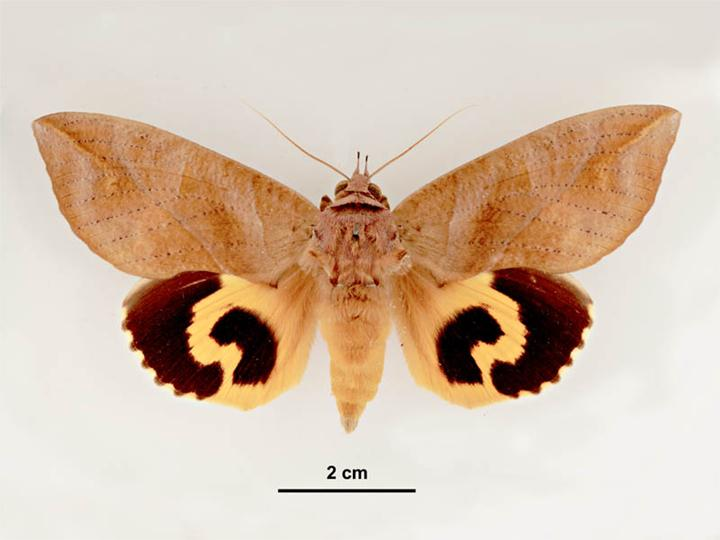
Male, dorsal view

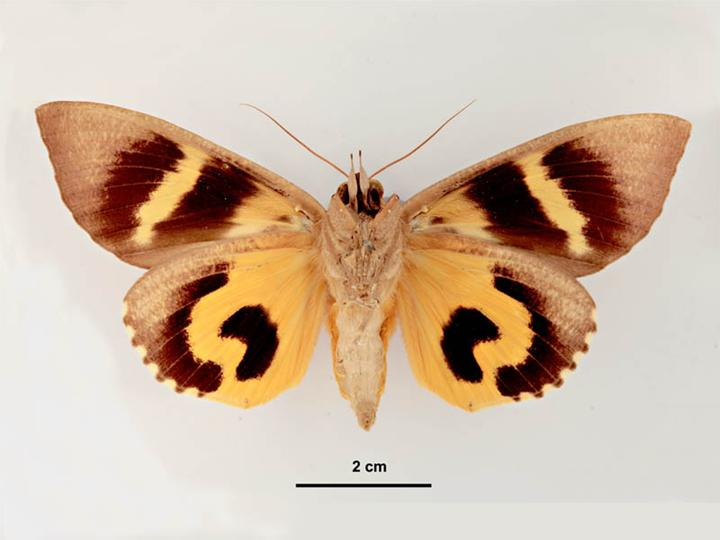
Male, ventral view

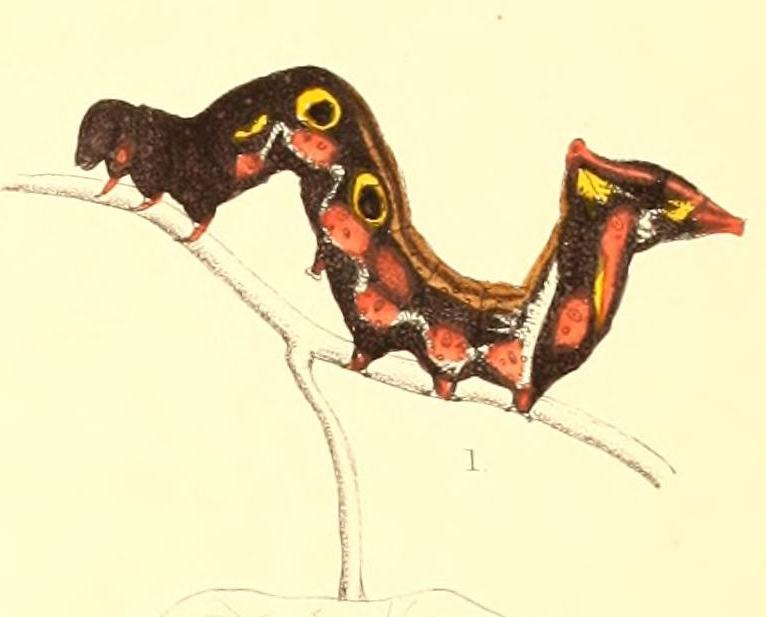
Larva

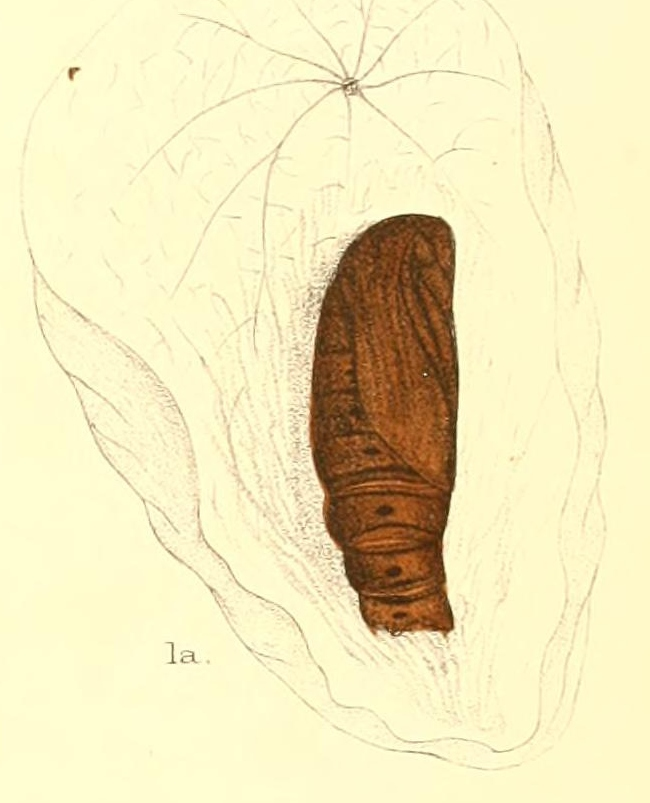
Pupa

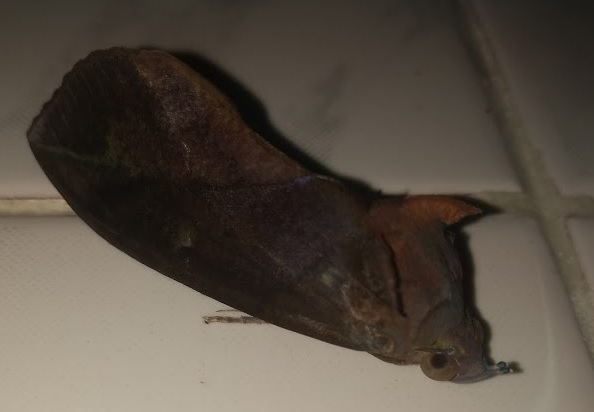
Male, Goa
