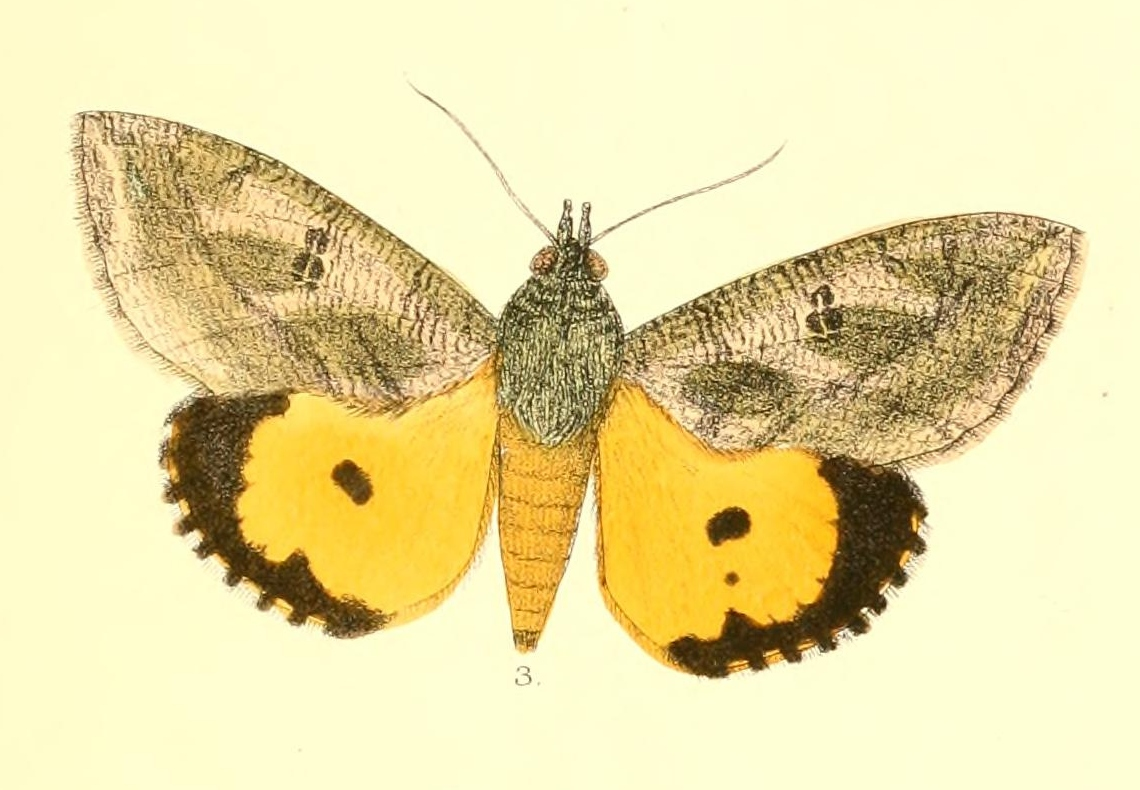
- Male
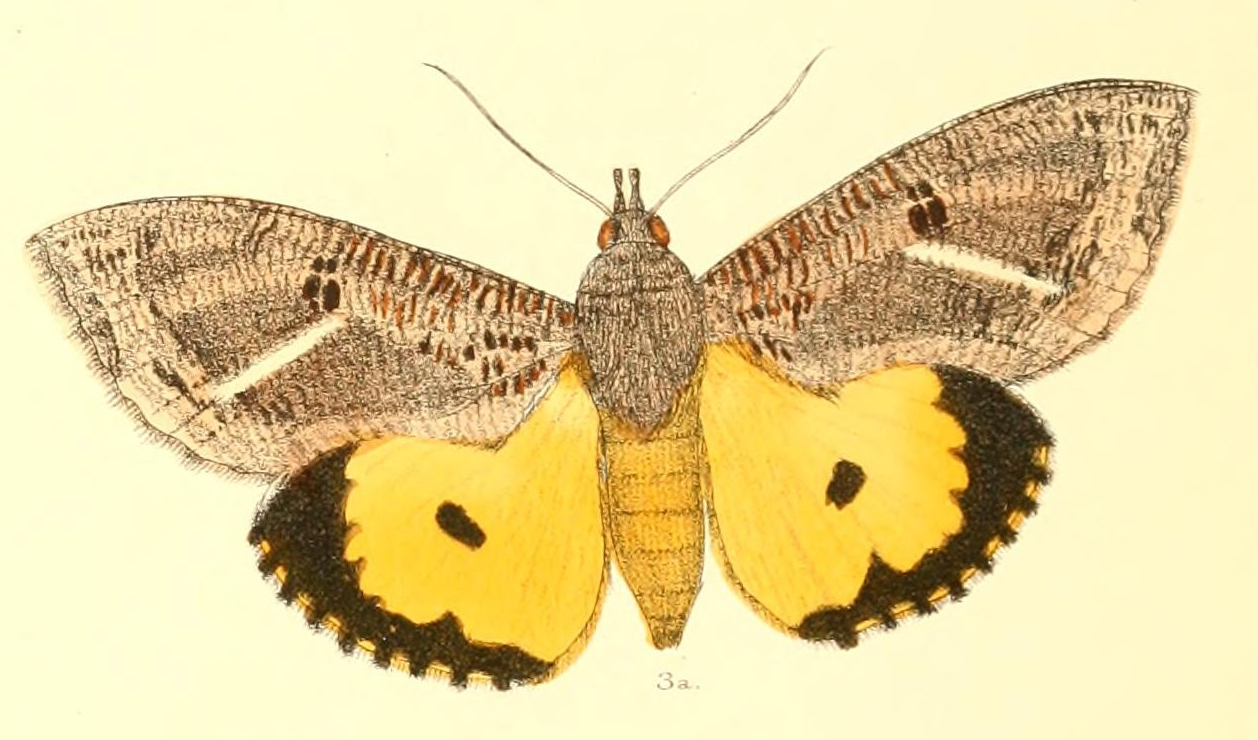
- Female

Scientific classification
- Kingdom: Animalia
- Phylum: Arthropoda
- Class: Insecta
- Order: Lepidoptera
- Superfamily: Noctuoidea
- Family: Erebidae
- Genus: Eudocima
- Species: E. materna

Binomial name
- Eudocima materna (Linnaeus, 1767)

Synonyms
- Phalaena materna; Noctua hybrida; Ophideres apta See text; Ophideres chalcogramma

= Eudocima materna =

Dot-underwing

Species of moth

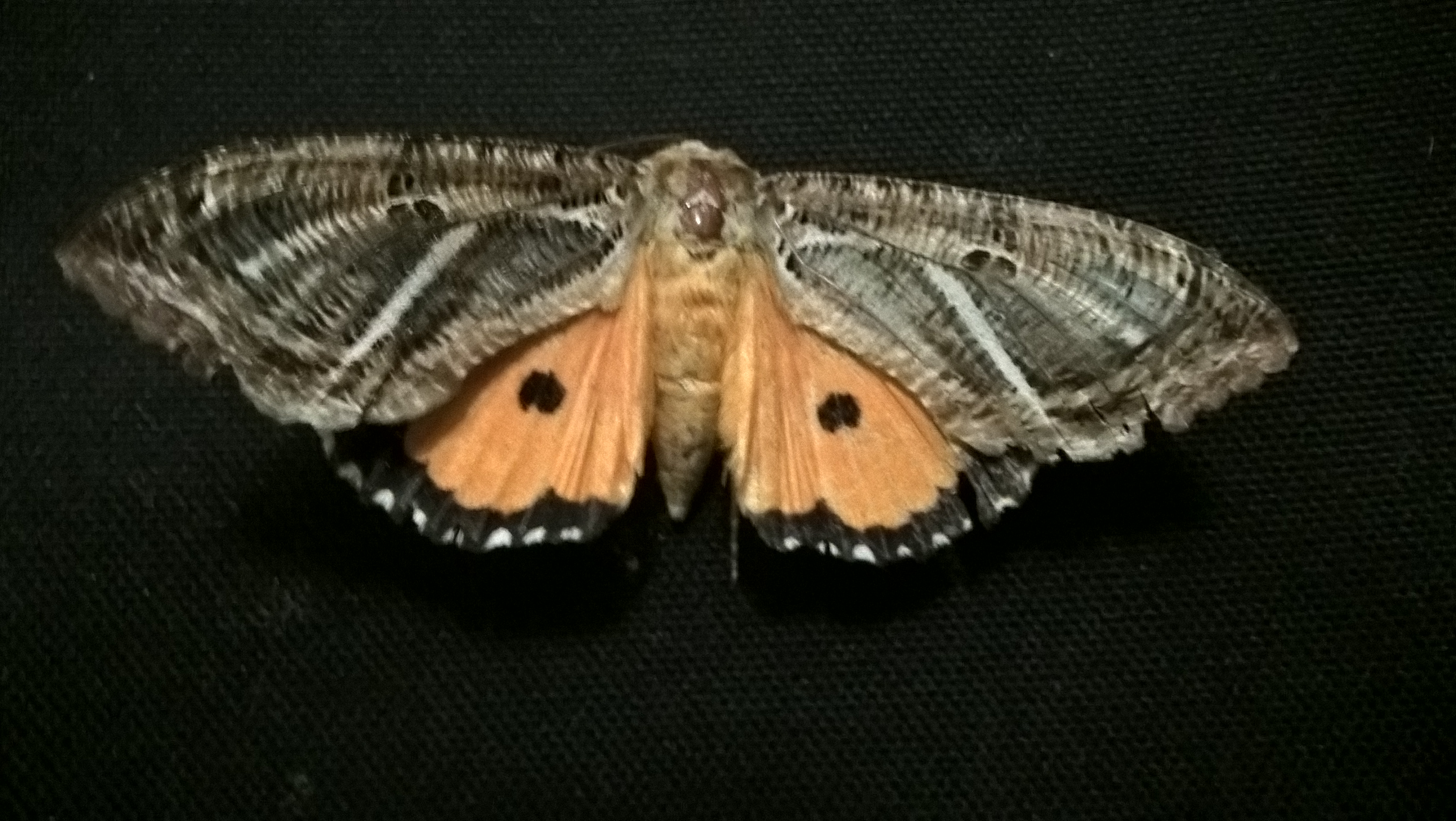
Fruit-piercing moth (Eudocima materna) seen near guavadilla vine (Passiflora edulis flavicarpa) in Durban, South Africa

Eudocima materna, the dot-underwing moth, is a moth of the family Erebidae found in widespread parts of the world, mainly in tropical Asia extending to New Guinea and Australia as well as in Africa. Reports from the United States, Canada and the French Antilles are now considered to be Eudocima apta. The species can be differentiated from other Eudocima moths by the presence of small central black dot in each hindwing. The species was first described by Carl Linnaeus in his 1767 12th edition of Systema Naturae.

== Description ==
The wingspan is about 60–96 mm. Palpi with third joint long and spatulate at extremity. Forewings with crenulate cilia in both sexes. Male has greenish-grey head and thorax. Abdomen orange. Forewings greenish grey with very numerous faint striated reddish lines. There are three rufous spots which can be seen at end of cell. A dark oblique line from near apex to centre of inner margin. A silvery patch found on vein 1 and another below lower angle of cell. A marginal black band with crenulate inner edge. There is a series of white cilia spots. Ventral side is orange. Forewings with costa and apical area blotched with rufous. Oblique postmedial and sub-apical black bands can be seen. Hindwings with apical area blotched with rufous. A black spot found on costa and another beyond lower angle of cell. A marginal black band runs from vein 5 to anal angle.

Female much more prominently striated with rufous coloured forewings. The silvery patches found below and beyond cell very large and conjoined crossed by white streaks above vein 2 and beyond cell.

== Classification ==
Some older authors have considered Eudocima apta as a synonym of E. materna but more recent workers consider E. apta as a New World species that is very similar in appearance to E. materna (Eudocima apta (Walker, [1858]) = Eudocima materna of authors, not Linnaeus, 1767). Eudocima materna is therefore the Old World counterpart of E. apta, and a simple visual comparison of E. materna and E. apta reveals obvious differences of the two species in both sexes. Alberto Zilli and Willem Hogenes (2002) also report genitalic differences between the two species, most notably in the bursa.

== Ecology ==
The larvae feed on Menispermaceae species, including Tinospora smilacina and Legnephora moorei.

== Gallery ==
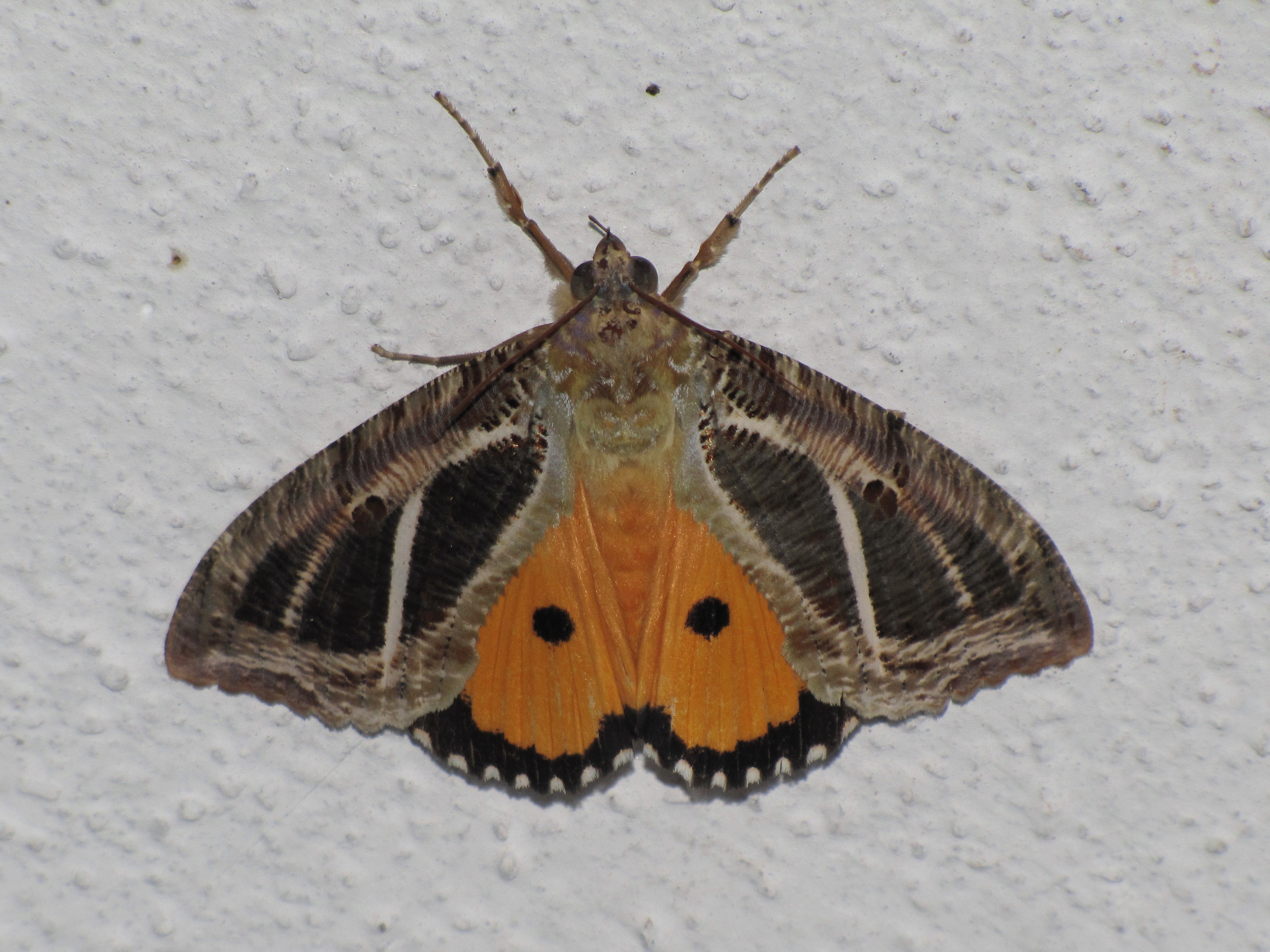
Female, from Kasaragod, Kerala

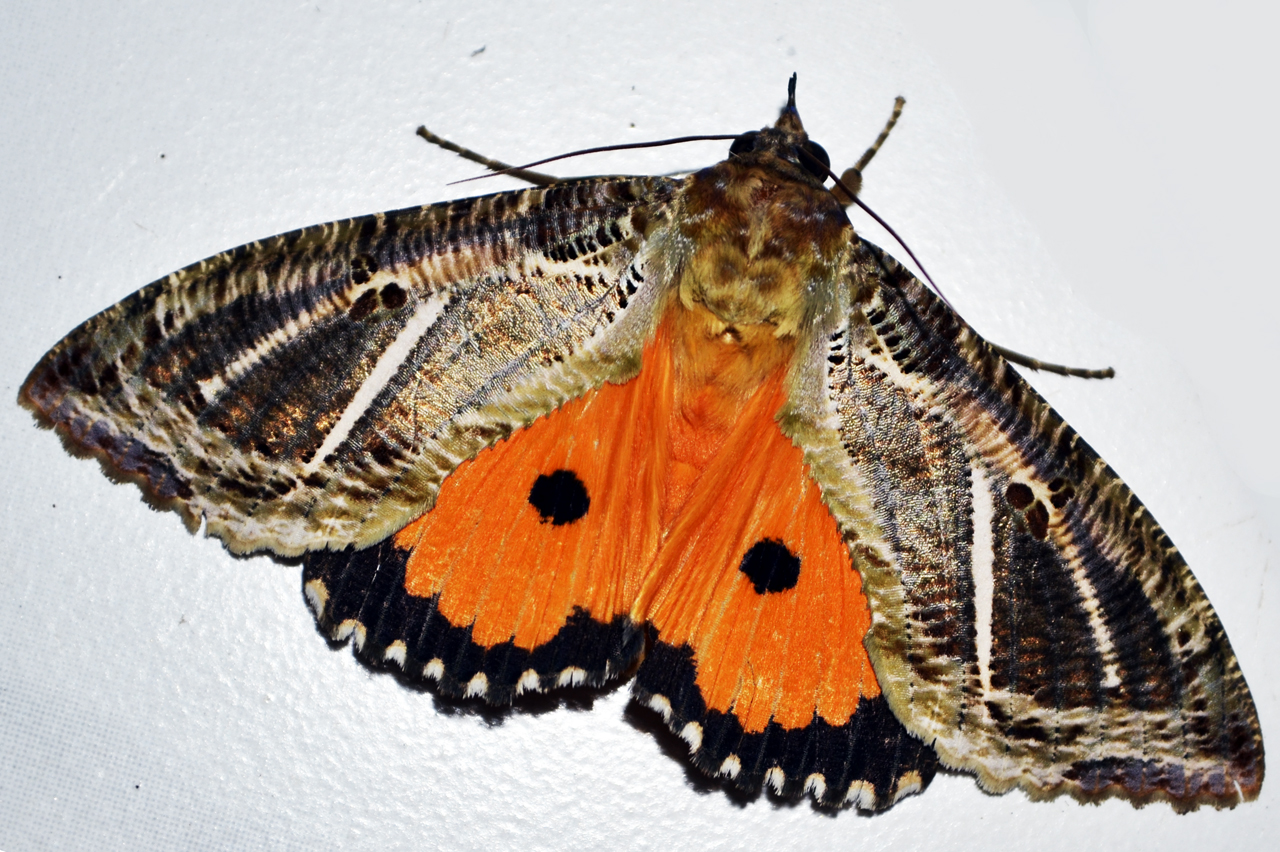
From Palakkad - Kalpathy, Kerala

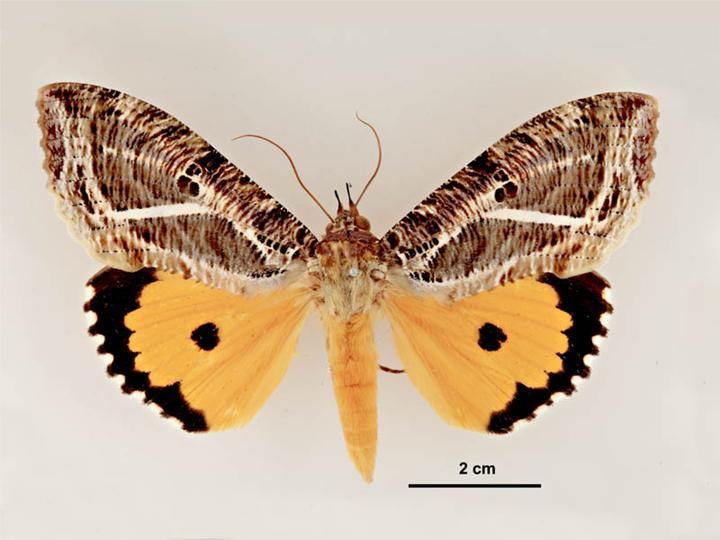
Female, dorsal view

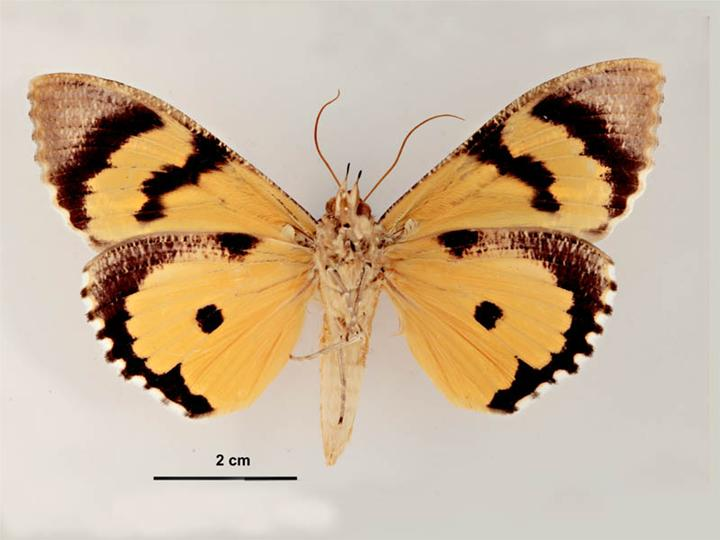
Female, ventral view

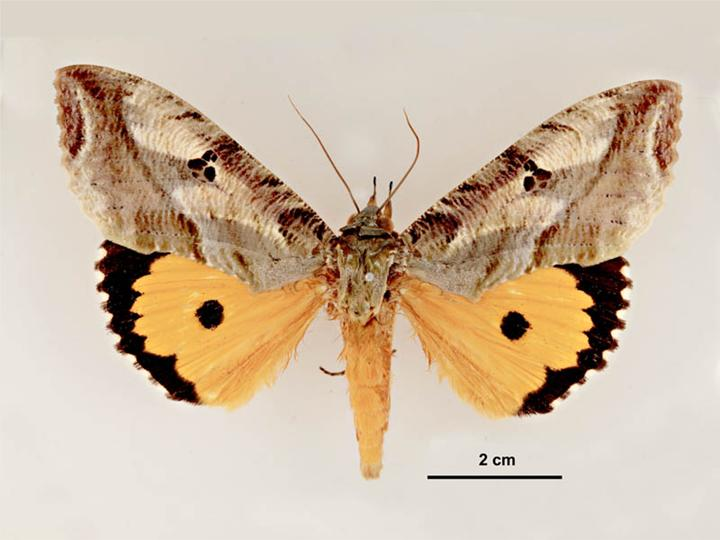
Male, dorsal view

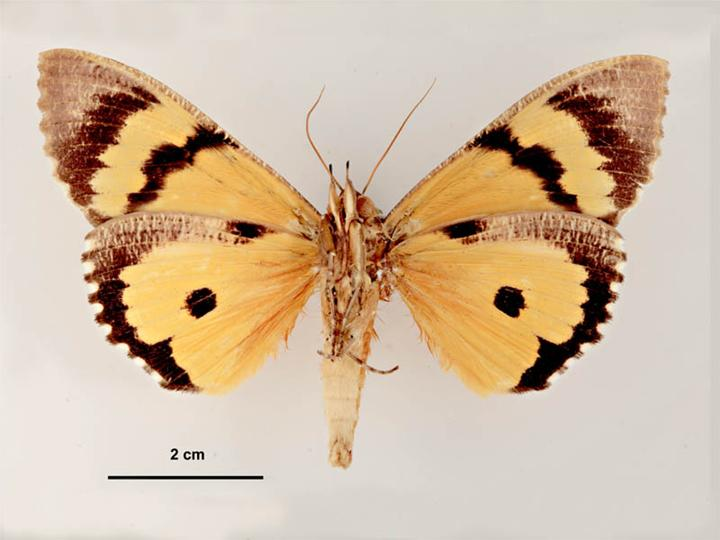
Male, ventral view

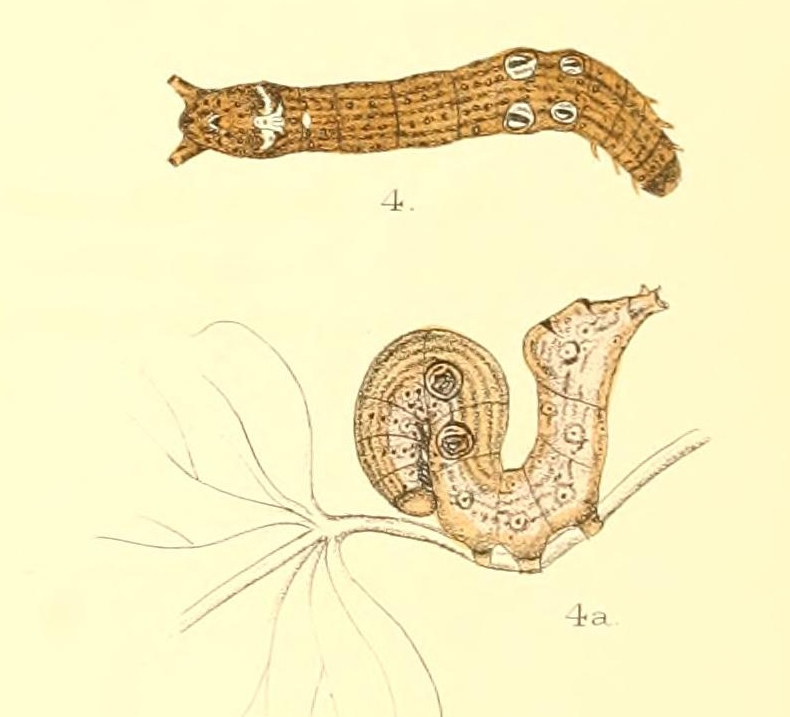
Larva

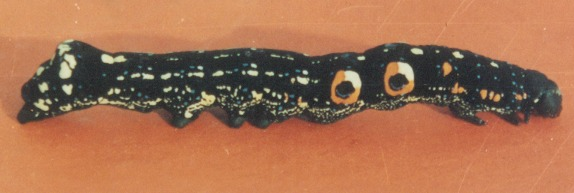
Fifth-instar larva
