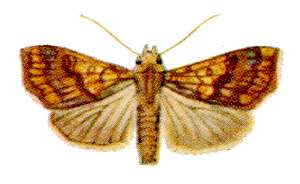

Scientific classification
- Kingdom: Animalia
- Phylum: Arthropoda
- Class: Insecta
- Order: Lepidoptera
- Superfamily: Noctuoidea
- Family: Erebidae
- Genus: Anomis
- Species: A. flava

Binomial name
- Anomis flava (Fabricius, 1775)

Synonyms
- Noctua flava; Noctua sigmatizans; Cosmophila xanthindyma; Cosmophila indica; Cirroedia variolosa; Cirroedia edentata; Cosmophila aurantiaca

= Anomis flava =

Species of moth

Anomis flava, the cotton looper, tropical anomis or white-pupiled scallop moth, is a moth of the family Erebidae. The species was first described by Johan Christian Fabricius in 1775. It is found in large parts of the world, including China, Hawaii, São Tomé and Príncipe, the Society Islands, Thailand, New Zealand, and Australia (New South Wales, Norfolk Island, Northern Territory, Queensland and Western Australia). Subspecies Anomis flava fimbriago is found in North America.

The wingspan is about 28 mm.

The larvae feed on Hibiscus rosa-sinensis, Hibiscus cannabinus and Legnephora moorei and Gossypium hirsutum.

== Subspecies ==
- Anomis flava flava
- Anomis flava fimbriago (Stephens, 1829)

== Gallery ==
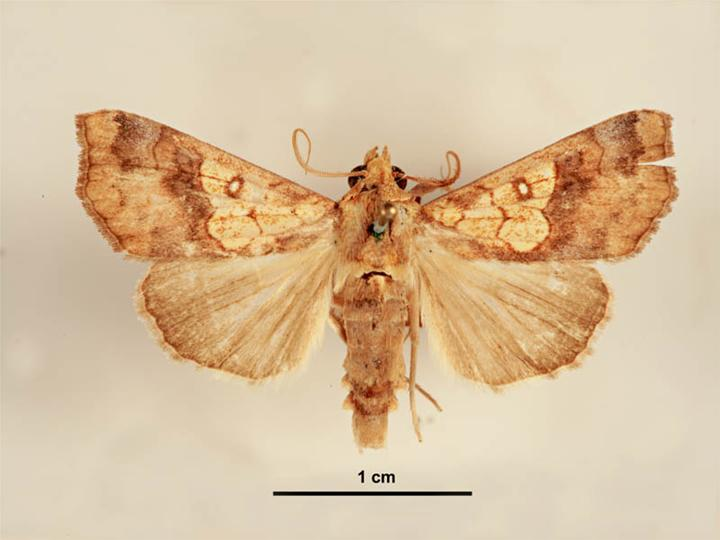
Female dorsal view

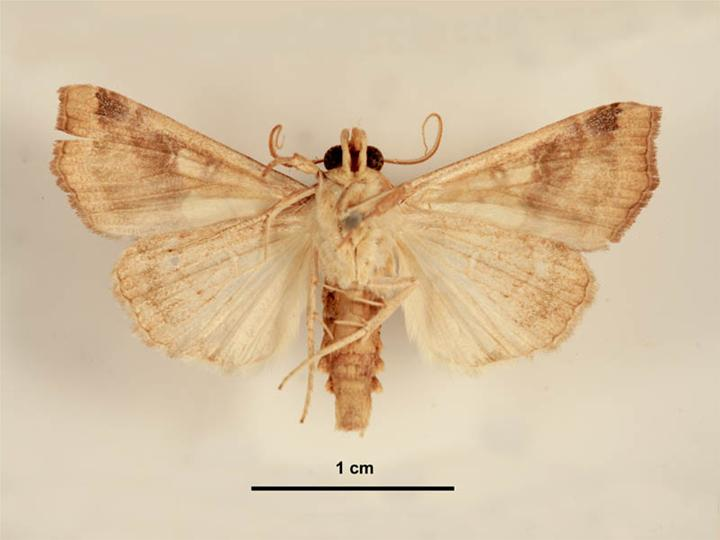
Female ventral view

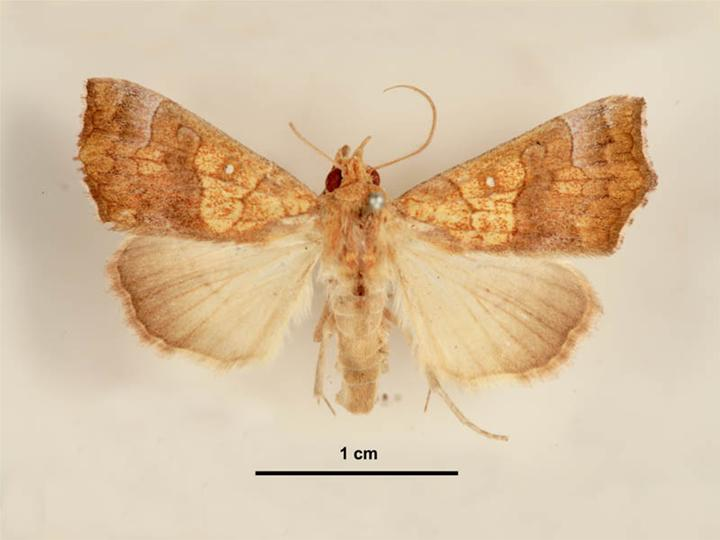
Male dorsal view

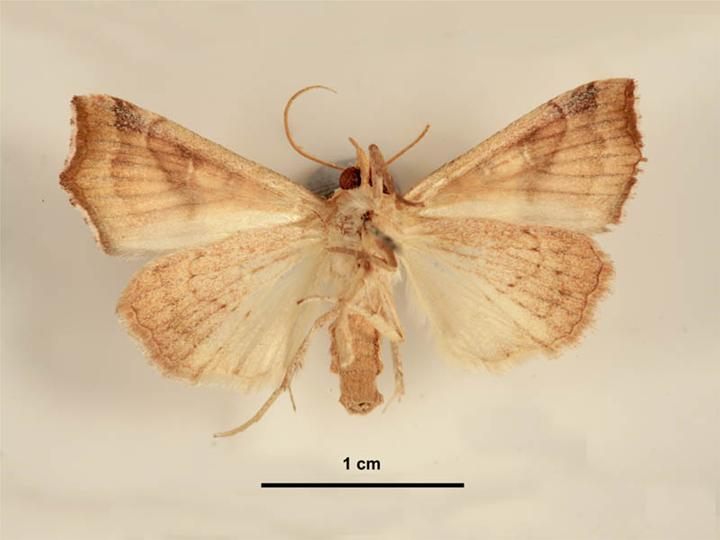
Male ventral view

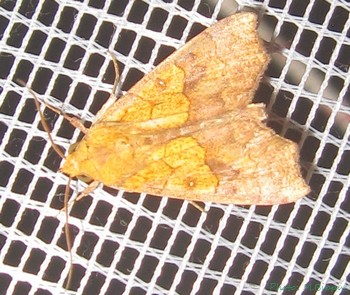
Live
