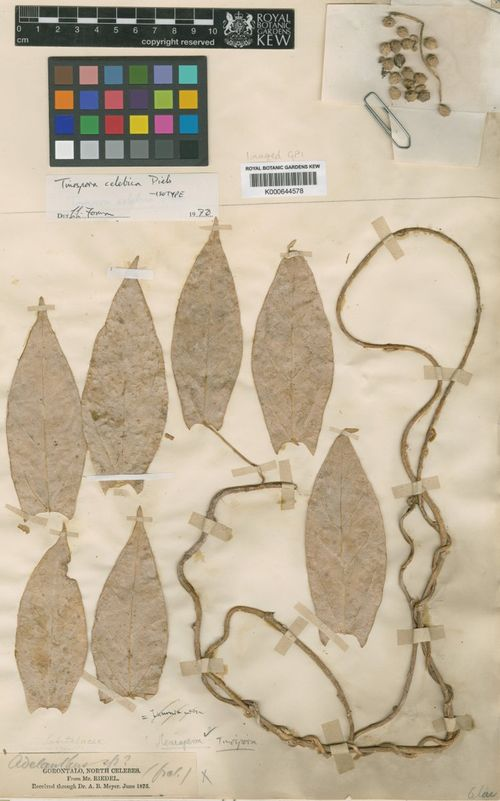

Scientific classification
- Kingdom: Plantae
- Clade: Tracheophytes
- Clade: Angiosperms
- Clade: Eudicots
- Order: Ranunculales
- Family: Menispermaceae
- Genus: Tinospora
- Species: T. celebica

Binomial name
- Tinospora celebica Diels

= Tinospora celebica =

Species of flowering plant

Tinospora celebica is a species of liana in the genus Tinospora that is endemic to Sulawesi. It grows on wet tropical biomes. Its conservation status is threatened.

== Description ==
The type specimen was collected in Gorontalo.

Tinospora celebica is a slender woody climber, entirely glabrous. Stems drying striate. Leaves with petioles 5–7 cm long, geniculate near base. Lamina coriaceous, lanceolate to lanceolate-oblong, base extended into 2 angular lobes sometimes shortly subfalcate, apex acuminate, 10–12 cm long, 4.5–5 cm wide. Primary nerves besides basal ones 5-palmate with 3–4 lateral pairs ascending on both sides, together with secondary nerves prominently reticulate on both surfaces when dry. Male and female flowers and inflorescences are unknown. Drupes small, endocarp subhemispherical, pointed at apex and base, outline almost hexangular, ventral side flat with round opening and longitudinal groove, otherwise warty-rough, 8 mm long, 5–6 mm wide.

== Taxonomy and naming ==
It was described in 1910 by Ludwig Diels in Das Pflanzenreich IV. 94 (Heft 46), from specimens collected by Johann Gerard Friedrich Riedel. It got its epithet from the island of Celebes, the type locality.

== Distribution and habitat ==
It is endemic to northern Sulawesi, Indonesia. It grows as a liana in forest environments. It grows on wet tropical biomes.

== Conservation ==
This species is assessed as threatened, in a preliminary report.
