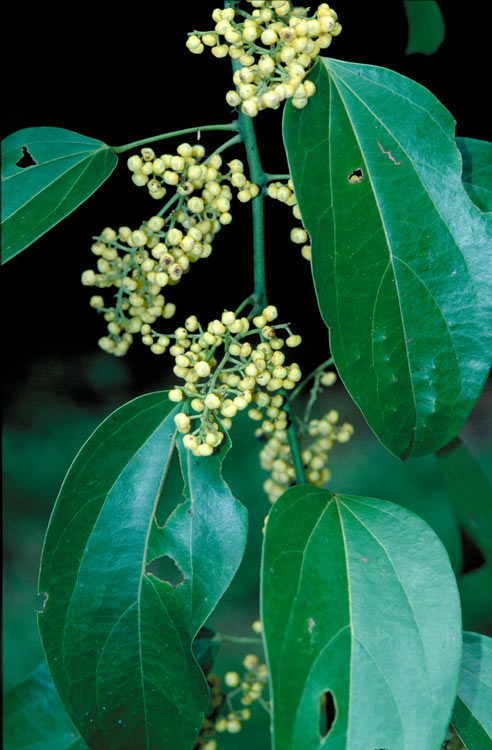
- Flowers and foliage

Conservation status
- Vulnerable (NCA)

Scientific classification
- Kingdom: Plantae
- Clade: Tracheophytes
- Clade: Angiosperms
- Clade: Eudicots
- Order: Ranunculales
- Family: Menispermaceae
- Genus: Hypserpa
- Species: H. polyandra

Binomial name
- Hypserpa polyandra Becc.

Synonyms
- 10 synonyms: Anamirta septemnervia K.Schum. ex Diels; Hypserpa latifolia Diels; Hypserpa monilifera Diels; Hypserpa polyandra var. tomentosa Forman; Hypserpa ponapensis Kaneh.; Hypserpa raapii Diels; Hypserpa selebica Becc.; Hypserpa trukensis Hosok.; Limacia latifolia Miq. ex Diels; Limacia monilifera Burkill; Pachygone ponapensis Kaneh.

= Hypserpa polyandra =

Species of flowering plant

Hypserpa polyandra is a species of plant in the family Menispermaceae native to parts of Malesia, New Guinea and northeastern Australia. It is a large woody vine with a stem up to 14 cm (5.5 in) diameter, first described by Odoardo Beccari in 1877. It grows in lowland rainforest and gallery forest up to about 100 m (330 ft) above sea level. In Queensland it has been recognised as a vulnerable species.
