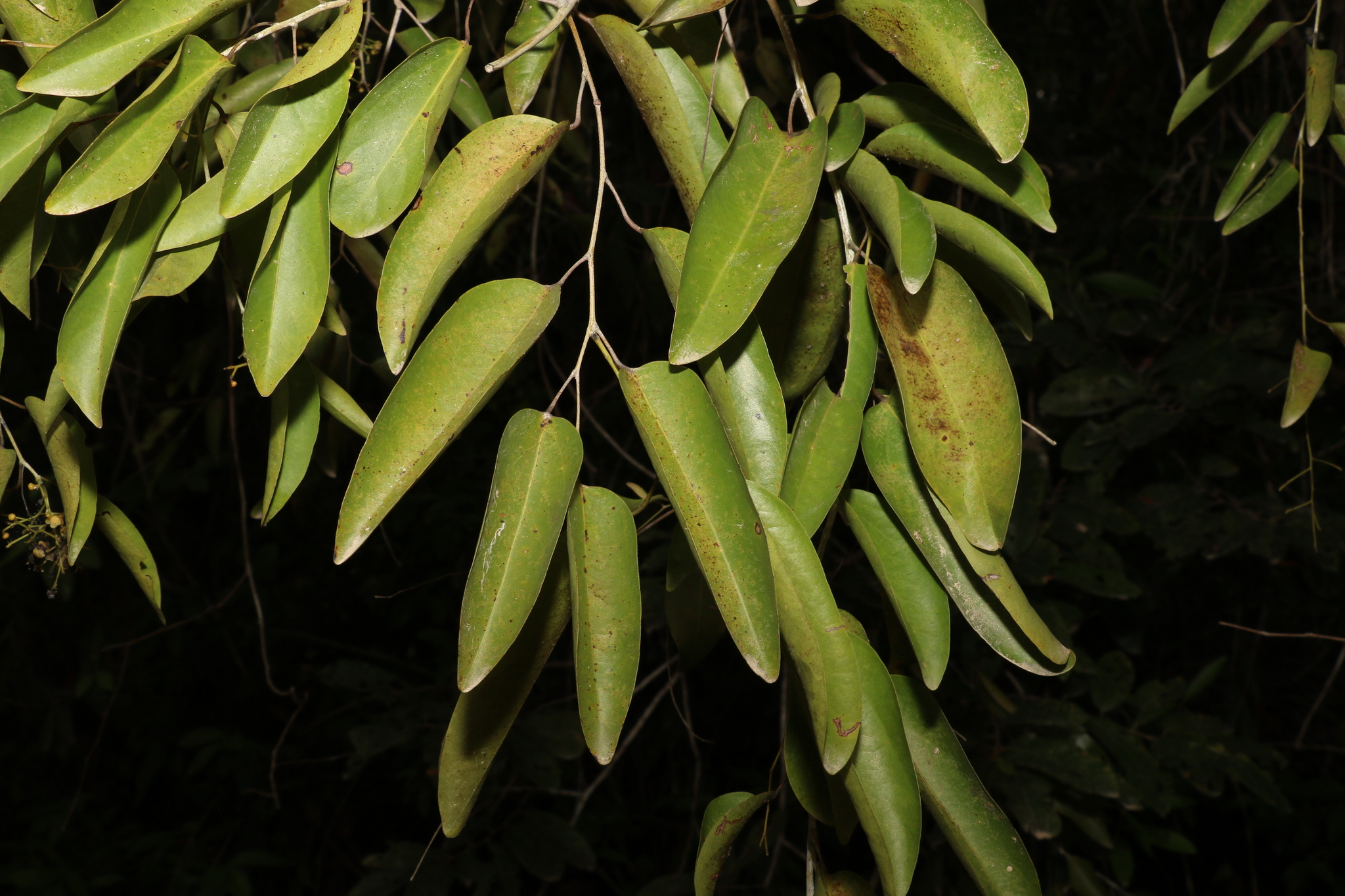

Conservation status
- Least Concern (NCA)

Scientific classification
- Kingdom: Plantae
- Clade: Tracheophytes
- Clade: Angiosperms
- Clade: Eudicots
- Order: Ranunculales
- Family: Menispermaceae
- Genus: Hypserpa
- Species: H. laurina

Binomial name
- Hypserpa laurina (F.Muell.)Diels
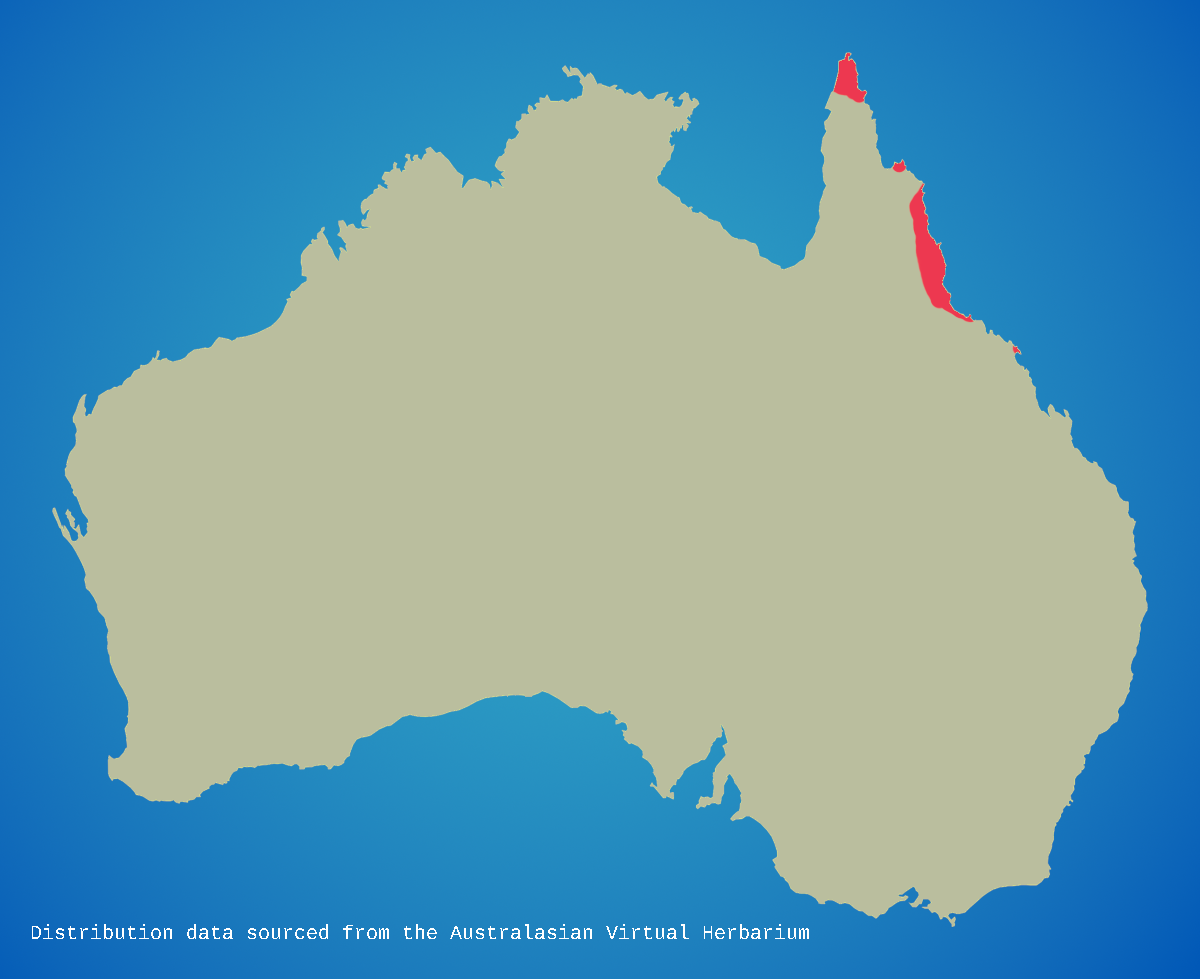

Synonyms
- Cocculus selwynii F.M.Bailey; Hypserpa selwynii F.Muell.; Limacia selwynii F.M.Bailey; Selwynia laurina F.Muell.; Hypserpa parvifolia Kaneh. & Hatus.

= Hypserpa laurina =

Laurel-leaf hypserpa

Species of flowering plant

Hypserpa laurina is a slender twining climber in the plant family Menispermaceae. It is native to New Guinea and northeastern Queensland in Australia.

== Description ==
This species is a small vine with a maximum recorded stem diameter of 10 cm (3.9 in). It has pendulous branches and the leaves are alternate, 3-veined, elliptic, and measure up to 20 by 7.5 cm (7.9 by 3.0 in)

Flowers are pale yellow in colour, male flowers measure about 5 mm (0.20 in) diameter, female flowers about 3–4 mm (0.12–0.16 in) diameter.

The fruit is a red globular drupe measuring about 15 by 14 mm (0.6 by 0.6 in)

=== Phenology ===
Flowering occurs from July to February, fruits ripen from November to April.

== Taxonomy ==
This plant was first described in 1864 as Selwynia laurina by the German-born Australian botanist Ferdinand von Mueller, who published the name in his book Fragmenta phytographiæ Australiæ. In 1910 the German botanist Ludwig Diels reviewed the genus and gave this taxon the new combination Hypserpa laurina, which was published in Adolf Engler's work Das Pflanzenreich: Regni vegetabilis conspectus.

=== Etymology ===
The genus name Hypserpa is derived from a combination of the Ancient Greek words hypsos, "high", and herpo, "to creep", and refers to the habit of this plant reaching the forest canopy. The species epithet laurina refers to the similarity of the leaves to those of plants in the family Lauraceae.

== Distribution and habitat ==
Hypserpa laurina grows in rainforest on the east coast of northern Australia, from Airlie Beach in north Queensland, northwards to Cape York Peninsula and then to New Guinea. It can be found at altitudes from sea level to about 1000 m.

== Ecology ==
Fruits of the laurel-leaf hypserpa are eaten by cassowaries and fruit pigeons.

== Conservation ==
This species is listed by the Queensland Department of Environment and Science as least concern. As of 21 November 2022, it has not been assessed by the IUCN.

== Gallery ==
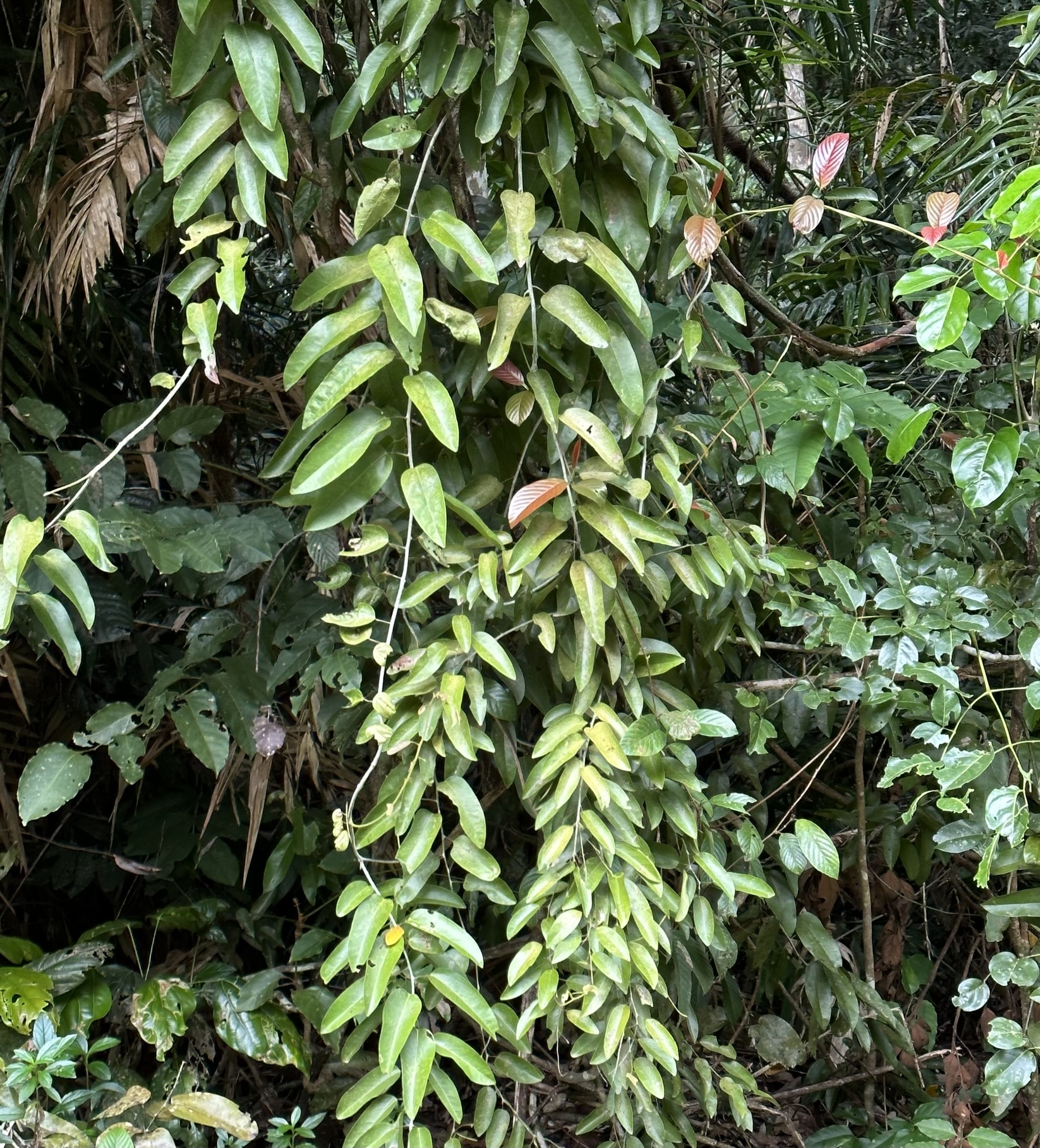
Habit

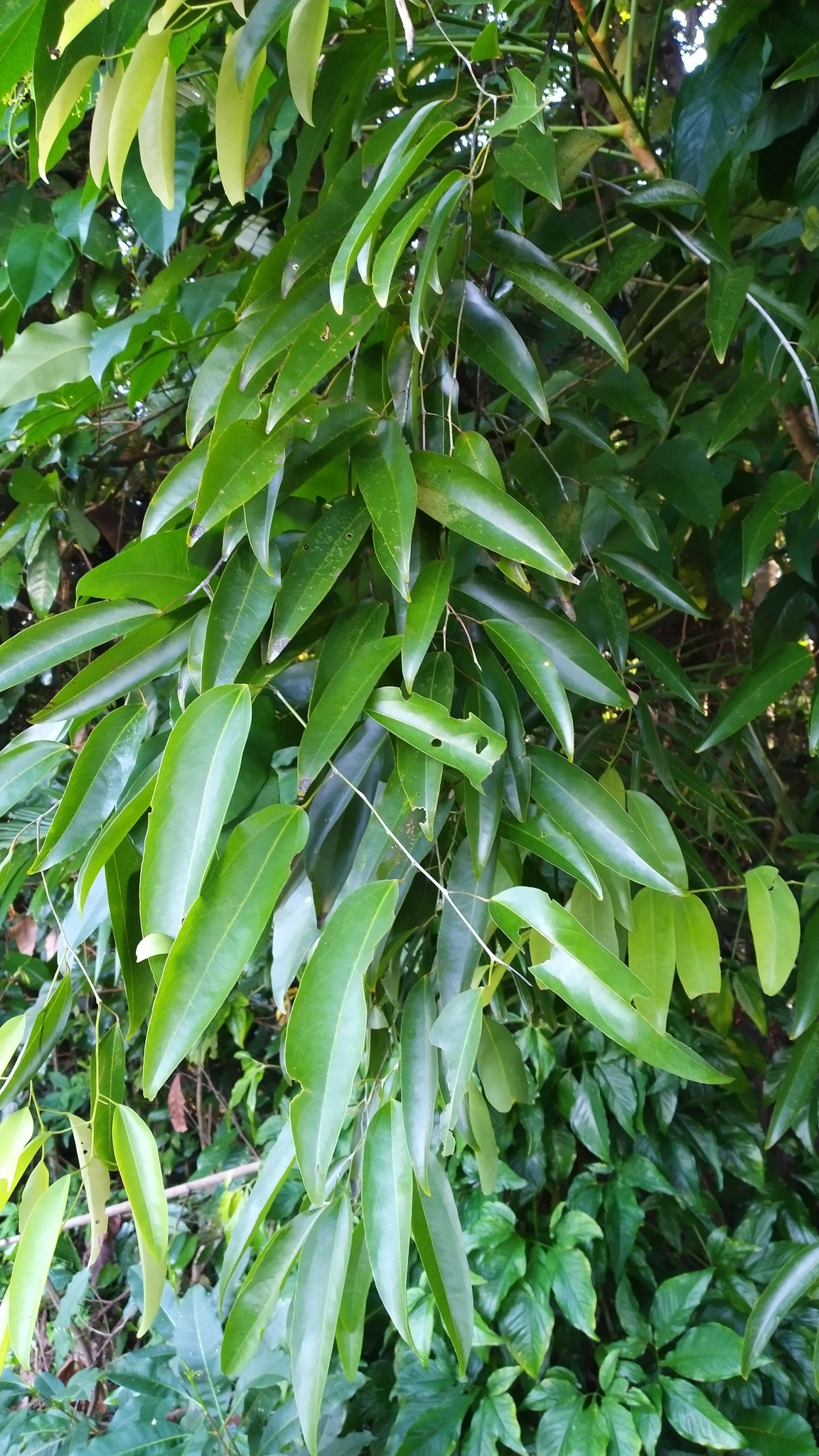
Foliage

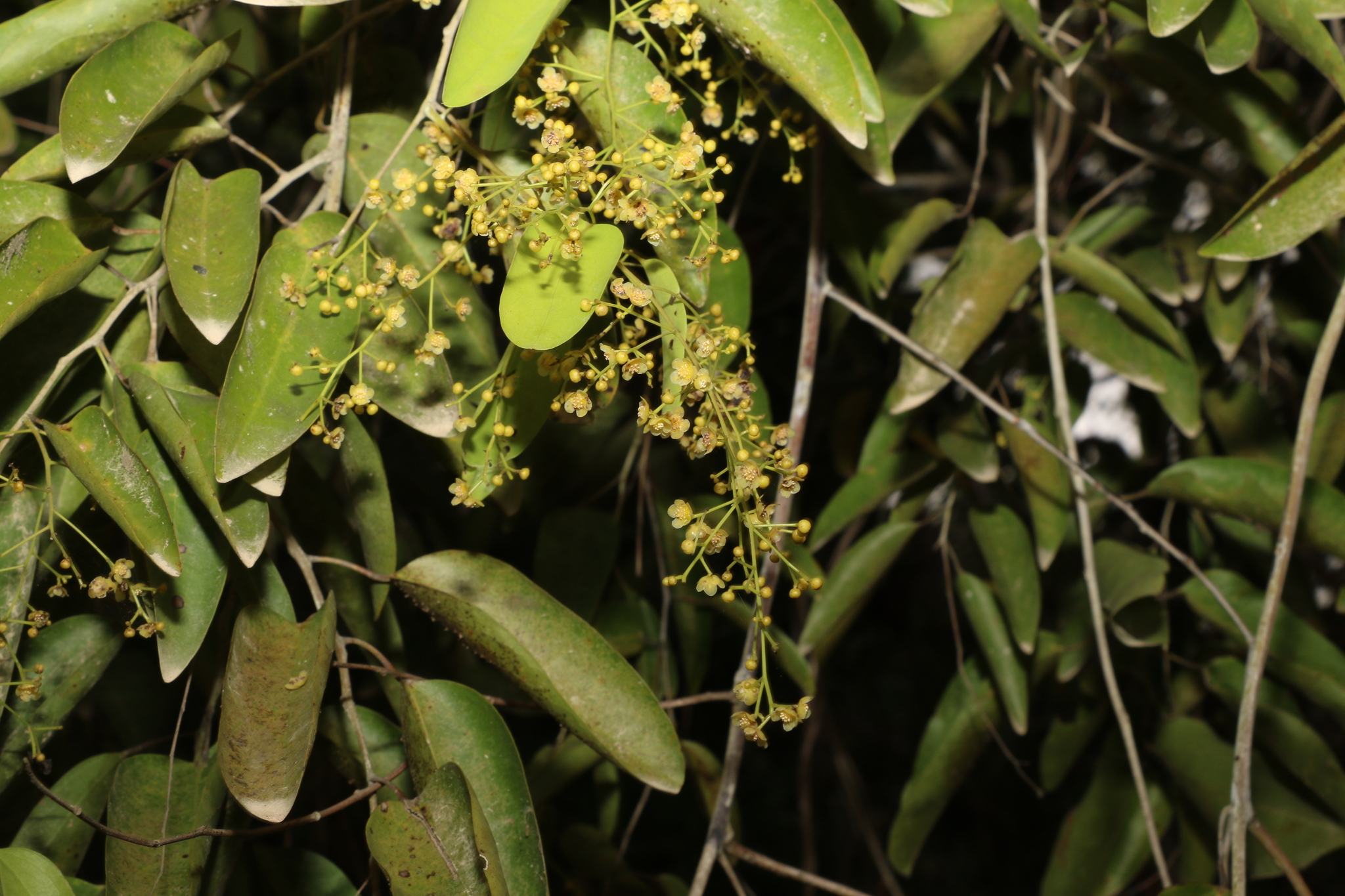
Inflorescence

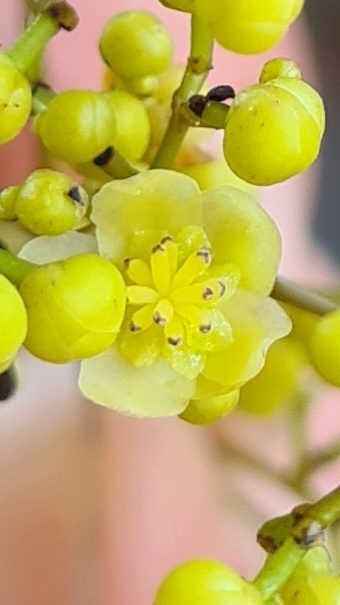
Close-up of flower

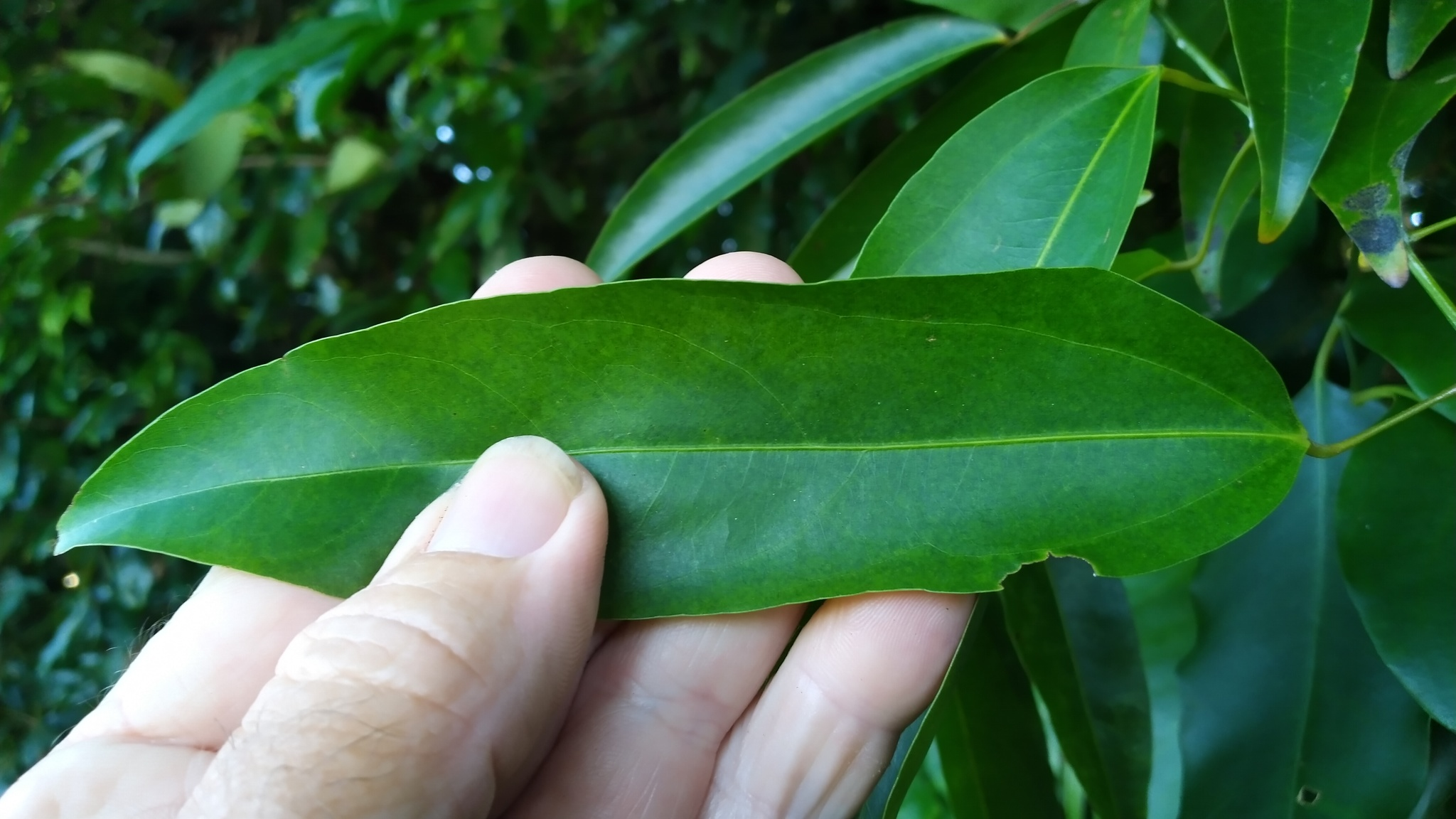
Leaf venation
