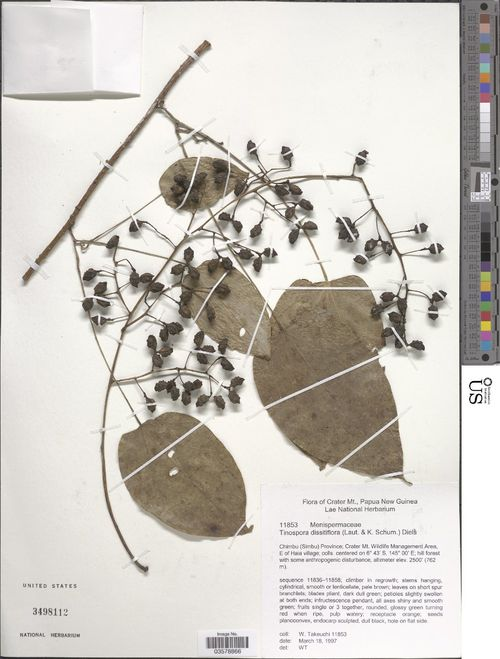

Scientific classification
- Kingdom: Plantae
- Clade: Embryophytes
- Clade: Tracheophytes
- Clade: Spermatophytes
- Clade: Angiosperms
- Clade: Eudicots
- Order: Ranunculales
- Family: Menispermaceae
- Genus: Tinospora
- Species: T. dissitiflora

Binomial name
- Tinospora dissitiflora Diels

Synonyms
- Aspidocarya dissitiflora K.Schumach. & Lauterb.; Aspidocarya pentaneura K.Schumach. ex Diels; Aspidocarya stenothyrsus K.Schumach.; Tinospora peekelii Diels

= Tinospora dissitiflora =

Species of flowering plant

Tinospora dissitiflora is a species of liana in the genus Tinospora that is endemic to New Guinea. It grows on wet tropical biomes. Its conservation status is not threatened.

== Description ==
The type specimen wa collected in Gorontalo.

Tinospora dissitiflora is a woody climber with stems approximately 1.5 cm in diameter, bark smooth fulvous verrucose when young. Petioles slender, glabrous, tortuous at base and geniculate, 10–12 cm long. Lamina glabrous, membranaceous, cordate, apex shortly acuminate, 10–15 cm long, 8–12 cm wide, lateral primary nerves approximately 5-palmate, besides 1–2 ascending on both sides, others transverse, all with veinlets prominently reticulate on both surfaces when dry. Male panicles arising from old stems, pedunculate, narrow, with peduncle 12–25 cm long, lateral racemes short 2–3 cm long, bracts concave ovate 1.5–2.5 cm long, pedicels 3–5 mm long, outer sepals 3 ovate concave erose 1.5–1.8 mm long, 0.8–1 mm wide, inner 3 broadly elliptic strongly concave 4–5 mm long, 3 mm wide, trinerved, petals 6 unguiculate broadly ovate or subcordate, filaments margin auriculate-embracing, 2–2.5 mm long, 1.5 mm wide, stamens 6 free, anthers conspicuously extrorse, thecae dehiscing by broad lateral slits, apex almost confluent. Female inflorescences paniculate, very broad, up to 50 cm long, pedicels strict 2–2.5 cm long. Drupes semiovoid, ventral side flat, endocarp irregularly hexangular warty, dorsal side convex not ribbed, ventral side deeply excavated with subradiate ribs, 12 mm long, 7–8 mm wide.

== Taxonomy and naming ==
It was described in 1910 by Ludwig Diels in Das Pflanzenreich IV. 94 (Heft 46), from specimens collected by Carl Adolf Georg Lauterbach. It got its epithet from Latin dissitus and flos, referring to the scattered or loosely arranged flowers in the inflorescence.

== Distribution and habitat ==
It is endemic to New Guinea. It grows as a liana in forest environments. It grows on wet tropical biomes.

== Conservation ==
This species is assessed as not threatened, in a preliminary report.
