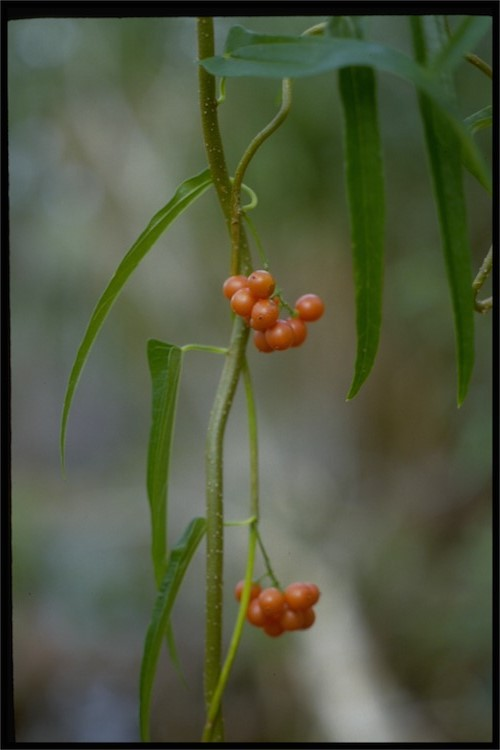
- Vine with fruit

Conservation status
- Least Concern (NCA)

Scientific classification
- Kingdom: Plantae
- Clade: Embryophytes
- Clade: Tracheophytes
- Clade: Spermatophytes
- Clade: Angiosperms
- Clade: Eudicots
- Order: Ranunculales
- Family: Menispermaceae
- Genus: Tinospora
- Species: T. esiangkara

Binomial name
- Tinospora esiangkara (F.M.Bailey) Forman
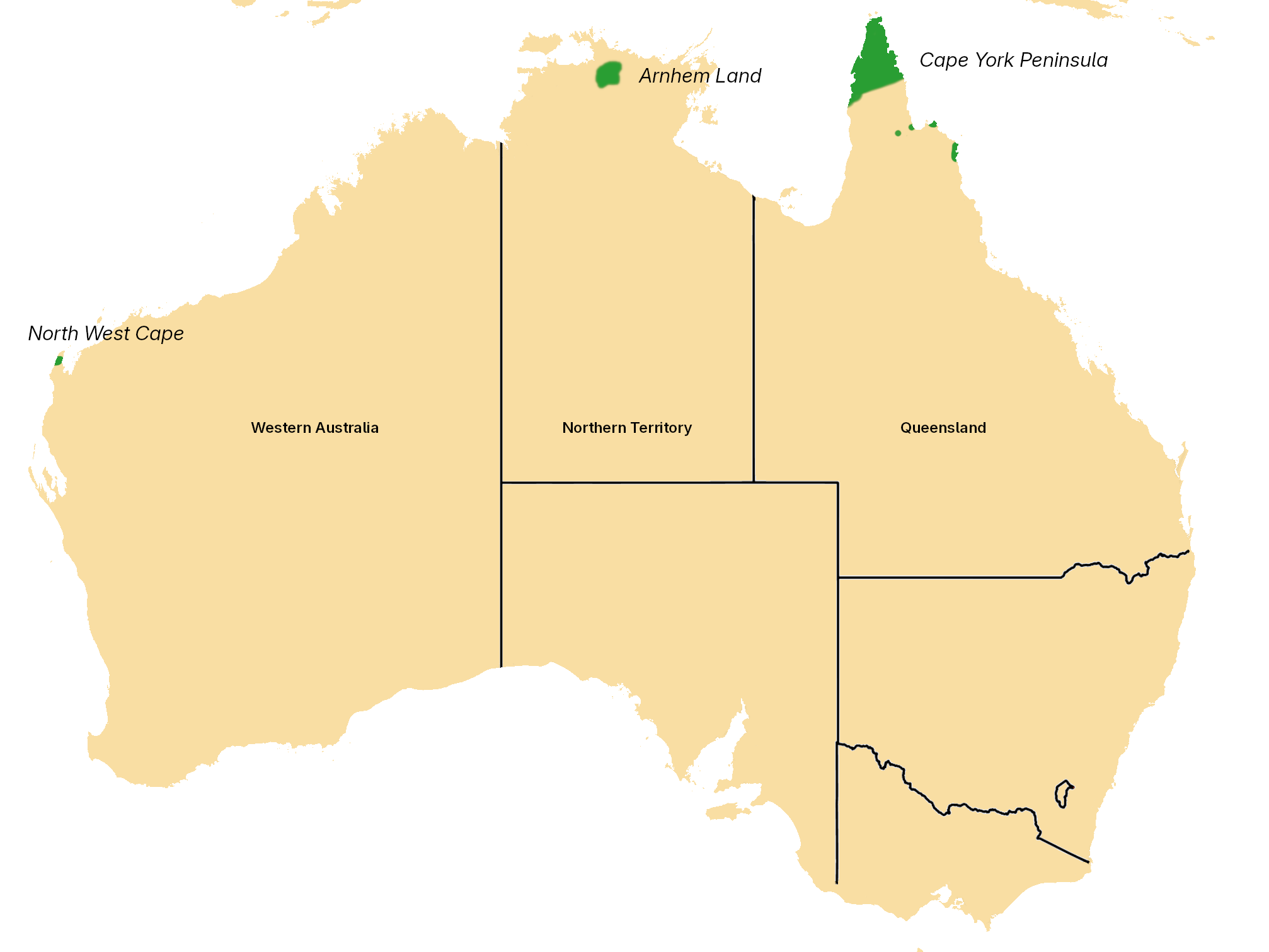

Synonyms
- Limacia esiangkara F.M.Bailey; Tinospora angusta Forman

= Tinospora esiangkara =

Species of flowering plant

Tinospora esiangkara is a species of plant in the family Menispermaceae. It is native to northern parts of Western Australia, the Northern Territory and Queensland, Australia.

== Description ==
It is a slender woody climber with a stem diameter up to 2 cm (0.8 in). The leaves are narrowly triangular to ovate, and measure up to 10 cm (4 in) long and 4 cm (1.6 in) wide. They are attached to the twigs by a petiole (leaf stem) about 1 cm (0.4 in) long.

Flowers are borne on racemes which emerge from the leaf axils. Both male and female flowers are about 3.5 mm (0.14 in) in diameter and have six petals and sepals. This species is dioecious, meaning that male and female flowers are borne on separate plants

The fruit is an ellipsoid drupe about 6 mm (0.24 in) long and orange-red in colour.

== Distribution ==
This species is endemic to Australia and occurs in three widely separated populations – Cape York Peninsula in Queensland, where the majority of occurrences are; Arnhem Land in the Northern Territory, roughly 1,000 km (620 mi) to the west; and North West Cape in Western Australia, another 2,250 km (1,400 mi) to the southwest. It grows in seasonally dry tropical forests.

== Conservation status ==
This species is listed as least concern under the Queensland Government's Nature Conservation Act. As of June 2026, it has not been assessed by the International Union for Conservation of Nature.
