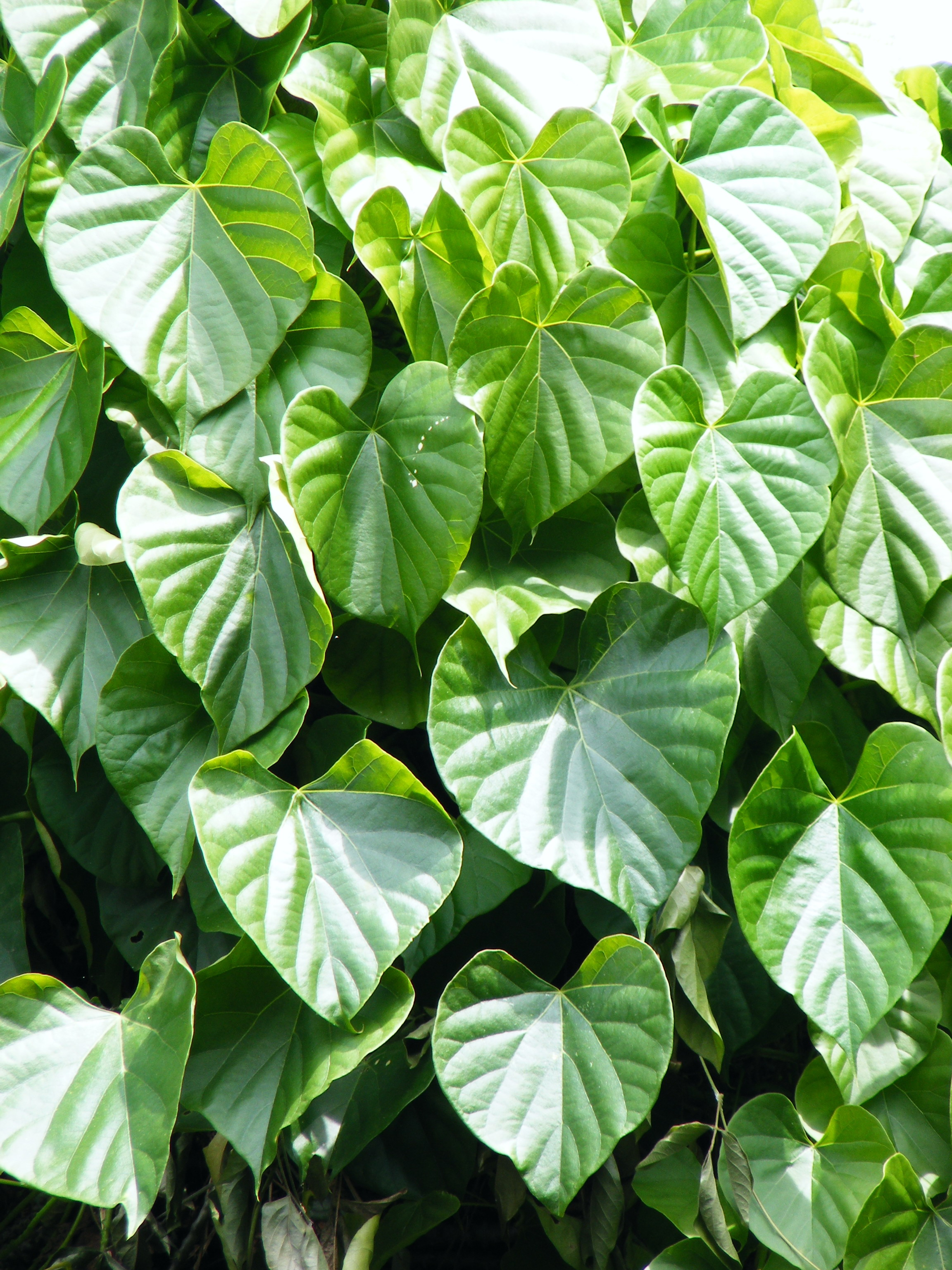
- Tinospora cordifolia

Scientific classification
- Kingdom: Plantae
- Clade: Tracheophytes
- Clade: Angiosperms
- Clade: Eudicots
- Order: Ranunculales
- Family: Menispermaceae
- Genus: Tinospora; Miers (1851)

Synonyms
- Heterotypic Synonyms: Campylus Lour.; Fawcettia F.Muell.; Hypsipodes Miq.

= Tinospora =

Genus of flowering plants

Tinospora is a genus of flowering plants in the family Menispermaceae. Its species have a succulent, woody, climbing shrub habit. Thirty-four species are currently recognized. Species generally send down long aerial roots from host trees. They have corky or papery bark. They are found in tropical and sub-tropical parts of Asia, Africa and Australia. The most common species are T. cordifolia and T. crispa.

It is native to the Andaman Islands, Angola, Assam, western Australia, Bangladesh, Benin, the Bismarck Archipelago, Borneo, Botswana, Burkina Faso, Burundi, Cambodia, the Caprivi Strip, Chad, south-central and southeast China, Christmas Island, East Himalaya, Eswatini, Ethiopia, Hainan, India, Java, Kenya, Laos, the Lesser Sunda Islands, the Maldives, Mali, the Maluku Islands, the Marianas Islands, Mauritania, Mozambique, Myanmar, Namibia, Nepal, New Caledonia, New Guinea, New South Wales, the Nicobar Islands, Niger, Nigeria, the Northern Provinces, the Northern Territory, Peninsular Malaysia, the Philippines, Queensland, Rwanda, Saudi Arabia, Senegal, the Solomon Islands, Somalia, Sri Lanka, Sudan, Sulawesi, Sumatra, Tanzania, Thailand, Vietnam, Zambia, and Zimbabwe.

== Species ==
Tinospora species accepted by Plants of the World Online include:

- Tinospora arfakiana Becc.
- Tinospora baenzigeri Forman
- Tinospora bakis (A.Rich.) Miers
- Tinospora celebica Diels
- Tinospora cordifolia (Willd.) Hook.f. & Thomson
- Tinospora crispa (L.) Hook.f. & Thomson
- Tinospora dissitiflora (K.Schum. & Lauterb.) Diels
- Tinospora esiangkara (F.M.Bailey) Forman
- Tinospora formanii Udayan & Pradeep
- Tinospora fragosa (I.Verd.) I.Verd. & Troupin
- Tinospora glabra (Burm.f.) Merr.
- Tinospora glandulosa Merr.
- Tinospora guangxiensis H.S.Lo
- Tinospora hainanensis H.S.Lo & Z.X.Li
- Tinospora hirsuta (Becc.) Forman
- Tinospora homosepala Diels
- Tinospora krispura I.M.Turner
- Tinospora macrocarpa Diels
- Tinospora maqsoodiana Mujaffar, Moinudd. & Mustakim
- Tinospora merrilliana Diels
- Tinospora neocaledonica Forman
- Tinospora nudiflora (Griff.) Kurz
- Tinospora orophila Troupin
- Tinospora palminervis Miers
- Tinospora siamensis Forman
- Tinospora sinensis (Lour.) Merr.
- Tinospora singapura I.M.Turner
- Tinospora smilacina Benth.
- Tinospora subcordata (Miq.) Diels
- Tinospora sumatrana Becc.
- Tinospora teijsmannii Boerl.
- Tinospora tenera Miers
- Tinospora tinosporoides (F.Muell.) Forman
- Tinospora trilobata Diels
