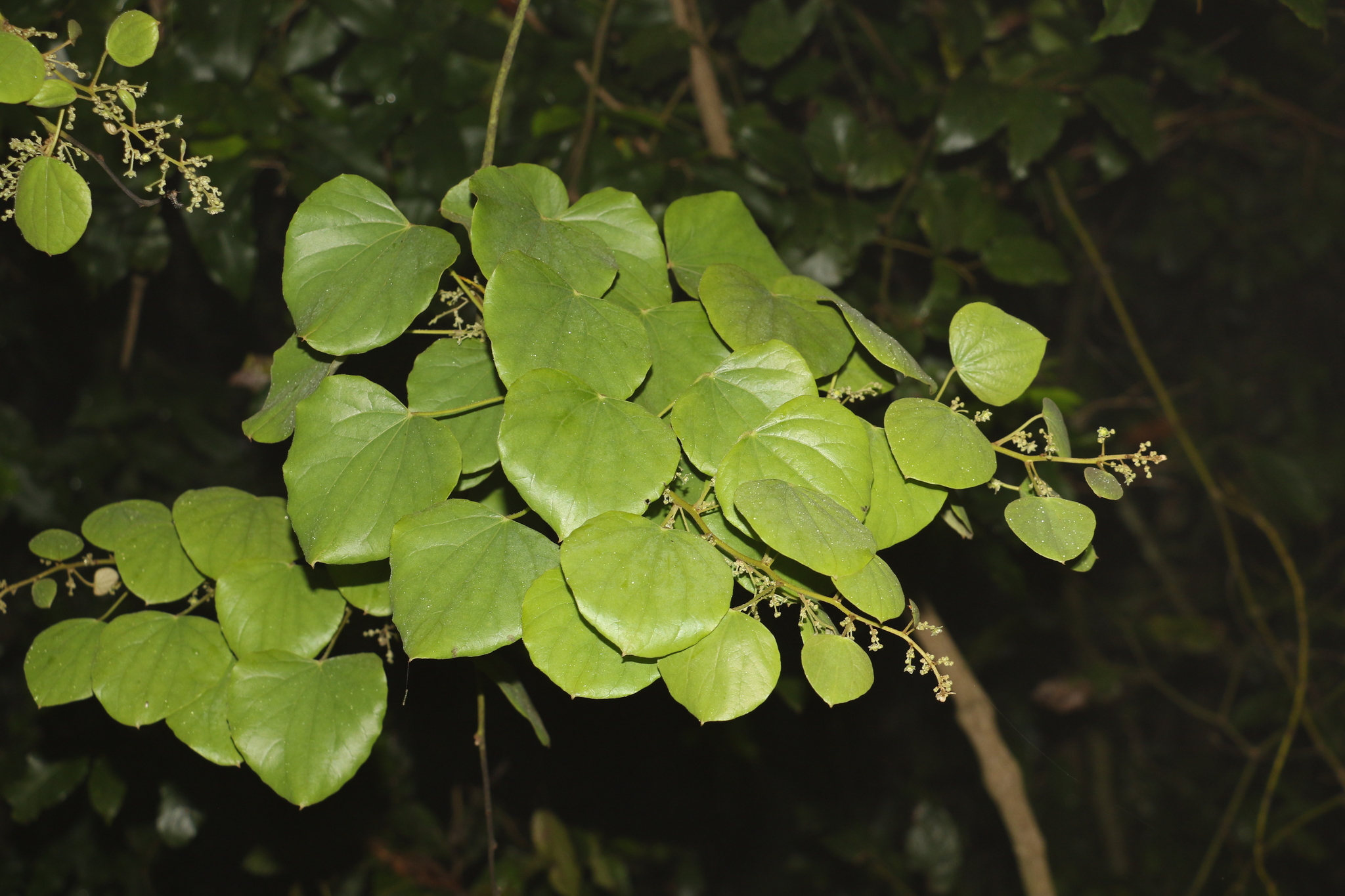
- Legnephora moorei

Scientific classification
- Kingdom: Plantae
- Clade: Tracheophytes
- Clade: Angiosperms
- Clade: Eudicots
- Order: Ranunculales
- Family: Menispermaceae
- Genus: Legnephora; Miers

Species
- Legnephora acuta; Legnephora microcarpa; Legnephora minutiflora; Legnephora moorei; Legnephora philippinensis

= Legnephora =

Genus of flowering plants

Legnephora is a genus of climbing flowering plants in the family Menispermaceae. It is native to the Bismarck Archipelago, the Maluku Islands, New Guinea, New South Wales, the Philippines, and Queensland. The name comes from ancient Greek, referring to a feature of the fruit anatomy being “border bearing”.

== Species ==
Accepted species in the genus include:

- Legnephora acuta Forman
- Legnephora microcarpa Forman
- Legnephora minutiflora (K.Schum.) Diels
- Legnephora moorei (F.Muell.) Miers
- Legnephora philippinensis Forman
