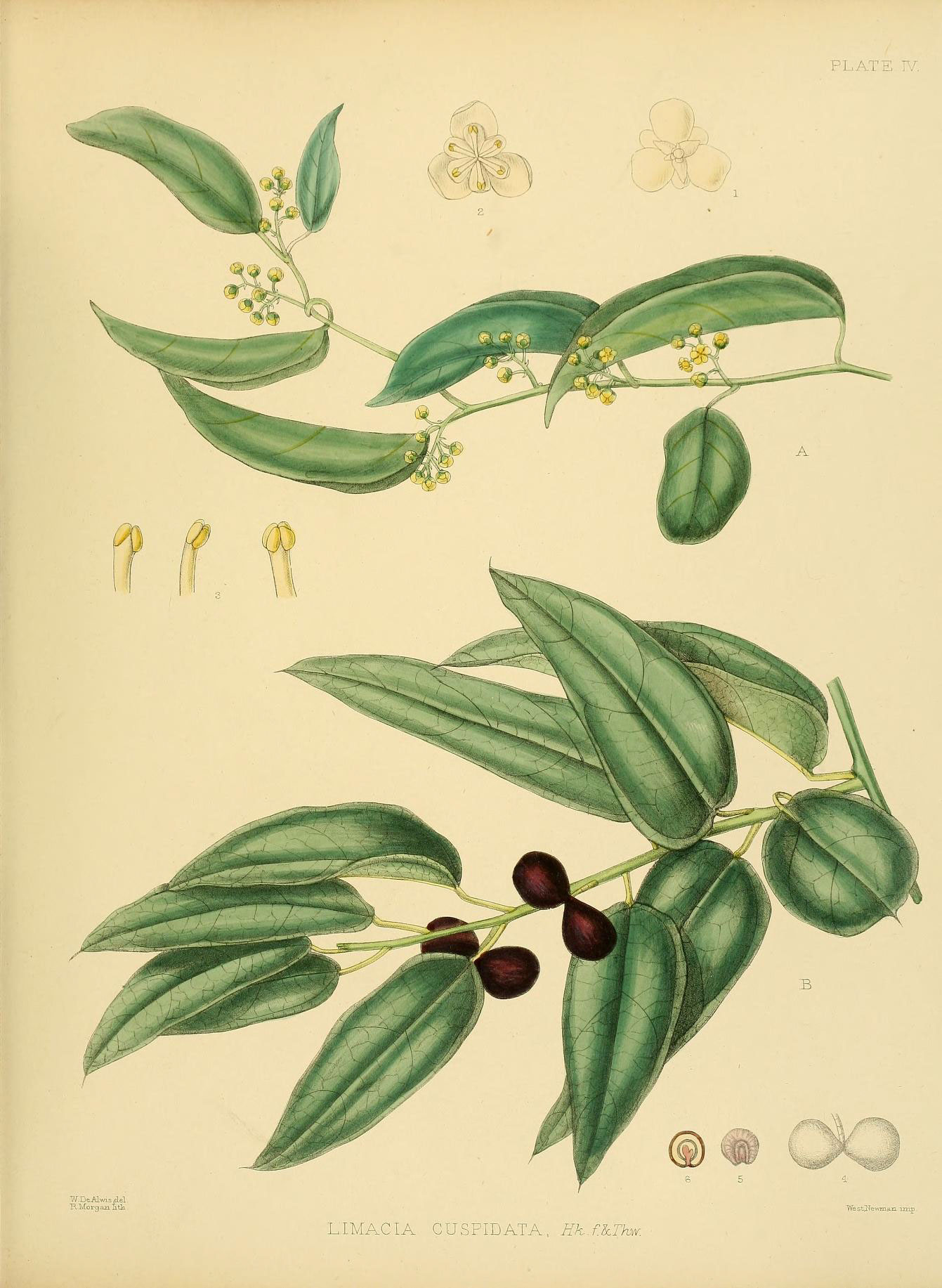
- A hand-book to the flora of Ceylon (Plate IV)

Scientific classification
- Kingdom: Plantae
- Clade: Tracheophytes
- Clade: Angiosperms
- Clade: Eudicots
- Order: Ranunculales
- Family: Menispermaceae
- Genus: Hypserpa; Miers

Synonyms
- Adelioides Banks & Sol. ex Britten; Adeliopsis Benth.; Selwynia F.Muell.

= Hypserpa =

Genus of plants

Hypserpa is a genus of woody climbing plants belonging to the family Menispermaceae. Its native range is tropical and subtropical Asia, northeastern Australia, and the western Pacific.

As of October 2025, Plants of the World Online accepts the following ten species:

- Hypserpa ademae W.N.Takeuchi
- Hypserpa calcicola Takeuchi
- Hypserpa decumbens (Benth.) Diels
- Hypserpa laurina (F.Muell.) Diels
- Hypserpa mackeei Forman
- Hypserpa neocaledonica Diels
- Hypserpa nitida Miers ex Benth.
- Hypserpa polyandra Becc.
- Hypserpa smilacifolia Diels
- Hypserpa vieillardii Diels
