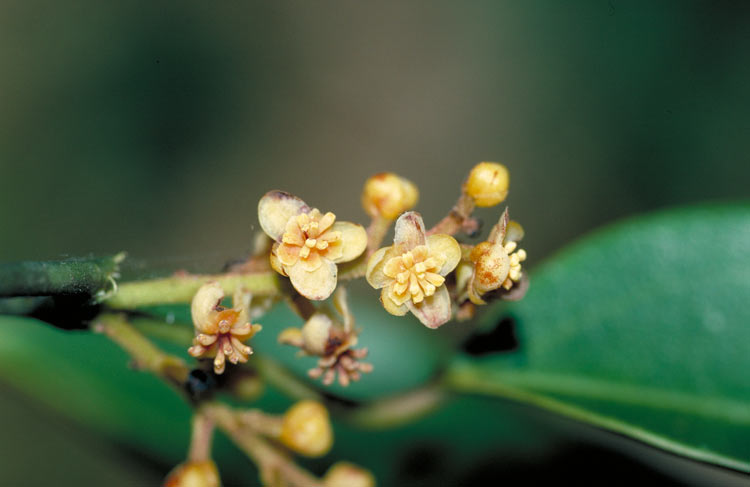
- Foliage

Conservation status
- Least Concern (NCA)

Scientific classification
- Kingdom: Plantae
- Clade: Tracheophytes
- Clade: Angiosperms
- Clade: Eudicots
- Order: Ranunculales
- Family: Menispermaceae
- Genus: Hypserpa
- Species: H. smilacifolia

Binomial name
- Hypserpa smilacifolia Diels

Synonyms
- Hypserpa reticulata Foreman

= Hypserpa smilacifolia =

Species of flowering plant

Hypserpa smilacifolia is a species of vine in the family Menispermaceae with a stem diameter up to 11 cm (4.3 in). It is endemic to Queensland, Australia, and grows in rainforest at altitudes from about 650 m (2,130 ft) to 1,250 m (4,100 ft). It was first described in 1910, based on material collected by John Dallachy in 1868. It has been given the conservation status of least concern.
