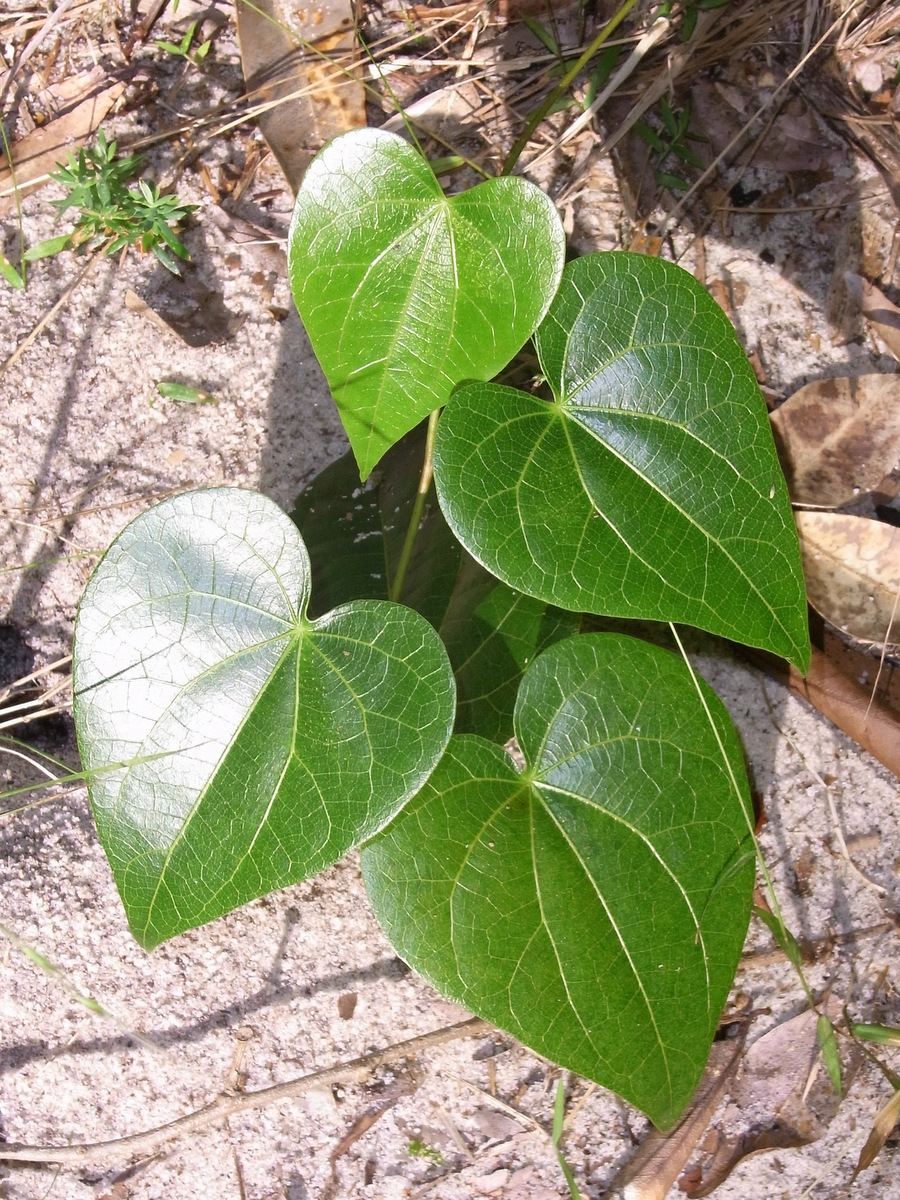
- Pearl vine at Wyrrabalong National Park, Australia

Scientific classification
- Kingdom: Plantae
- Clade: Embryophytes
- Clade: Tracheophytes
- Clade: Spermatophytes
- Clade: Angiosperms
- Clade: Eudicots
- Order: Ranunculales
- Family: Menispermaceae
- Genus: Sarcopetalum
- Species: S. harveyanum

Binomial name
- Sarcopetalum harveyanum F.Muell.

= Sarcopetalum =

Pearl vine

Species of flowering plant

Sarcopetalum is a monotypic genus of flowering plants belonging to the family Menispermaceae. The only species is Sarcopetalum harveyanum, known as pearl vine, native from New Guinea to Eastern and Southeastern Australia. It is a common plant in coastal areas of eastern Australia, in or around rainforests and also eucalyptus forests.

== Description ==
The leaf stalk is attached under the surface of the leaf. The leaves are heart shaped with raised leaf veins on both surfaces of the leaf. Seven veins branch out from the leaf base (A mid rib and three pairs of veins). The inner pair of veins extend almost all the way up the leaf.

Leaves are 4 to 12 cm long and 2 to 9 cm wide. The leaf stem is 1 to 8 cm long. The swelling at the base of the leaf stem is enlarged and evident.

Red or yellow flowers occur on racemes in summer. These racemes often grow from old wood on the vine. The flowers are tiny and seldom seen, petals 3 mm long. The fruit is a red drupe, 5 to 8 mm in diameter. They resemble a miniature bunch of grapes.

== Ecology ==
Pearl vine is food for the larvae of the moths Eudocima salaminia and Eudocima fullonia.

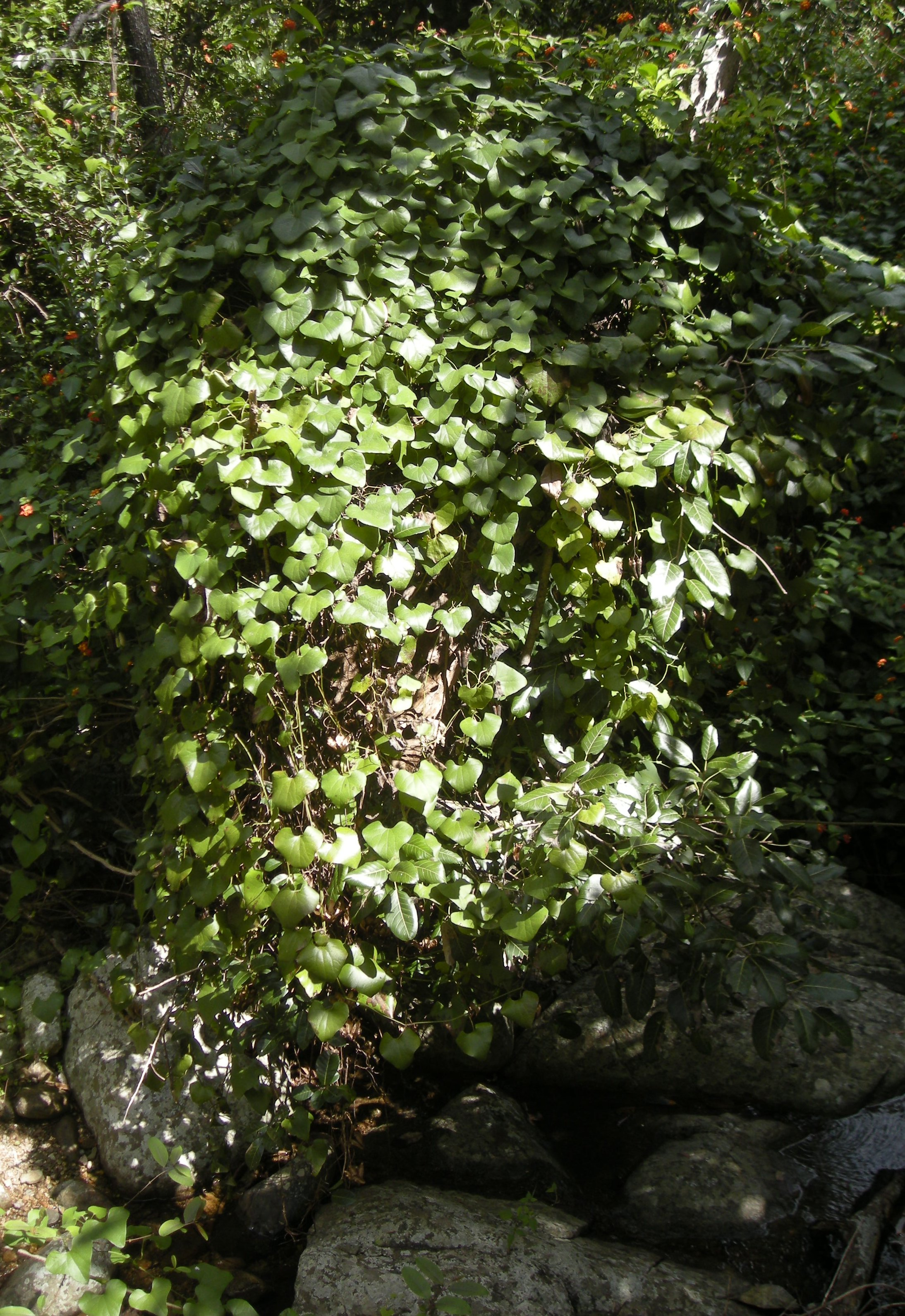
Growth habit
