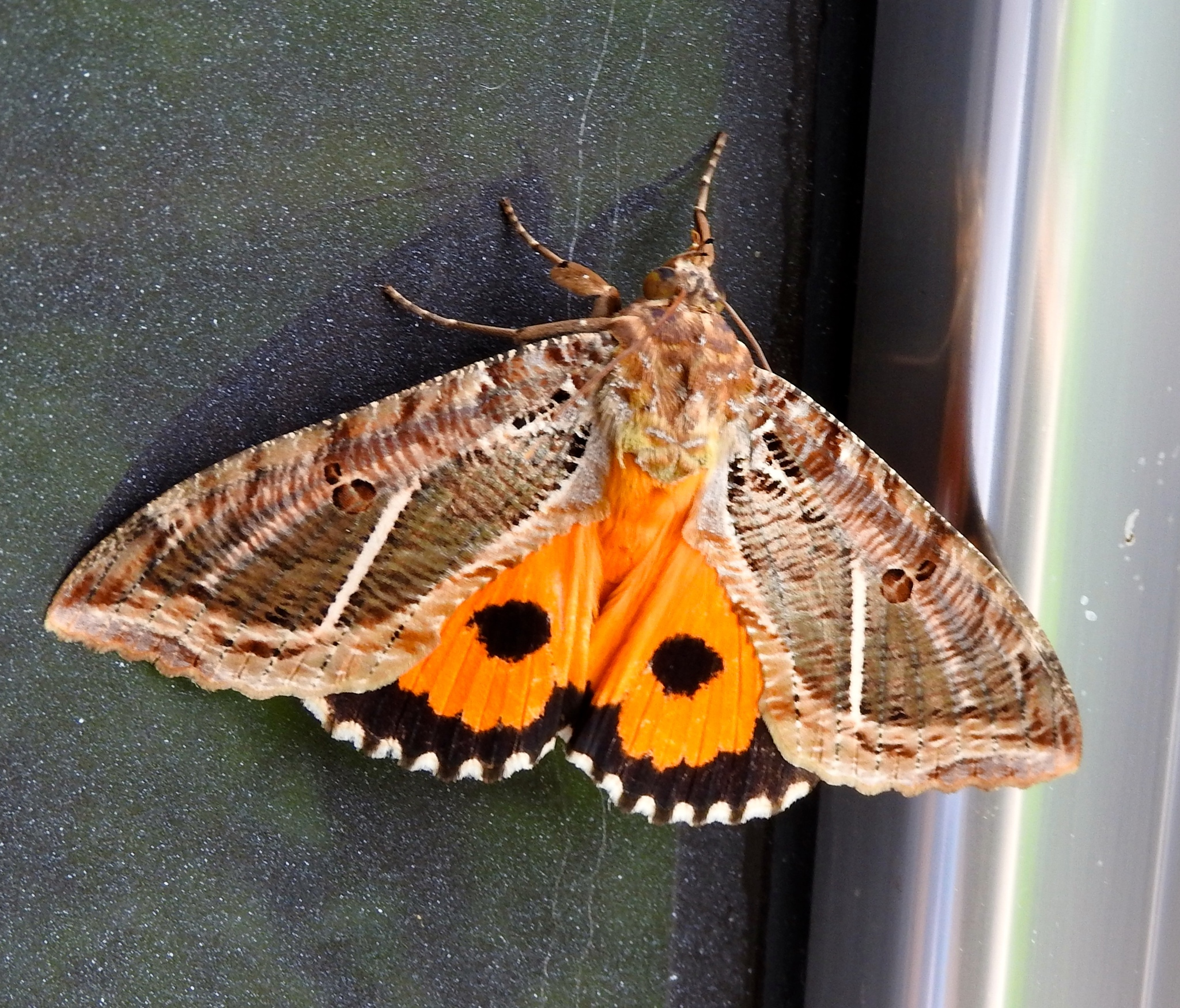

Scientific classification
- Kingdom: Animalia
- Phylum: Arthropoda
- Class: Insecta
- Order: Lepidoptera
- Superfamily: Noctuoidea
- Family: Erebidae
- Genus: Eudocima
- Species: E. apta

Binomial name
- Eudocima apta (Walker, 1857)

Synonyms
- Ophideres apta Walker, 1858

= Eudocima apta =

Species of moth

Eudocima apta is a moth of the family Erebidae. It is found in large parts of Brazil. At times it migrates north into the United States. The wingspan is about 45 mm.

== Classification ==
Some older authors have considered Eudocima apta as a synonym of E. materna but more recent workers consider apta as a New World species that is very similar in appearance to materna (Eudocima apta (Walker, [1858]) = Eudocima materna of authors, not Linnaeus, 1767). Eudocima materna is therefore the Old World counterpart of apta, and a simple visual comparison of materna and apta reveals obvious differences of the two species in both sexes. Zilli and Hogenes (2002) also report genitalic differences between the two species, most notably in the bursa.
