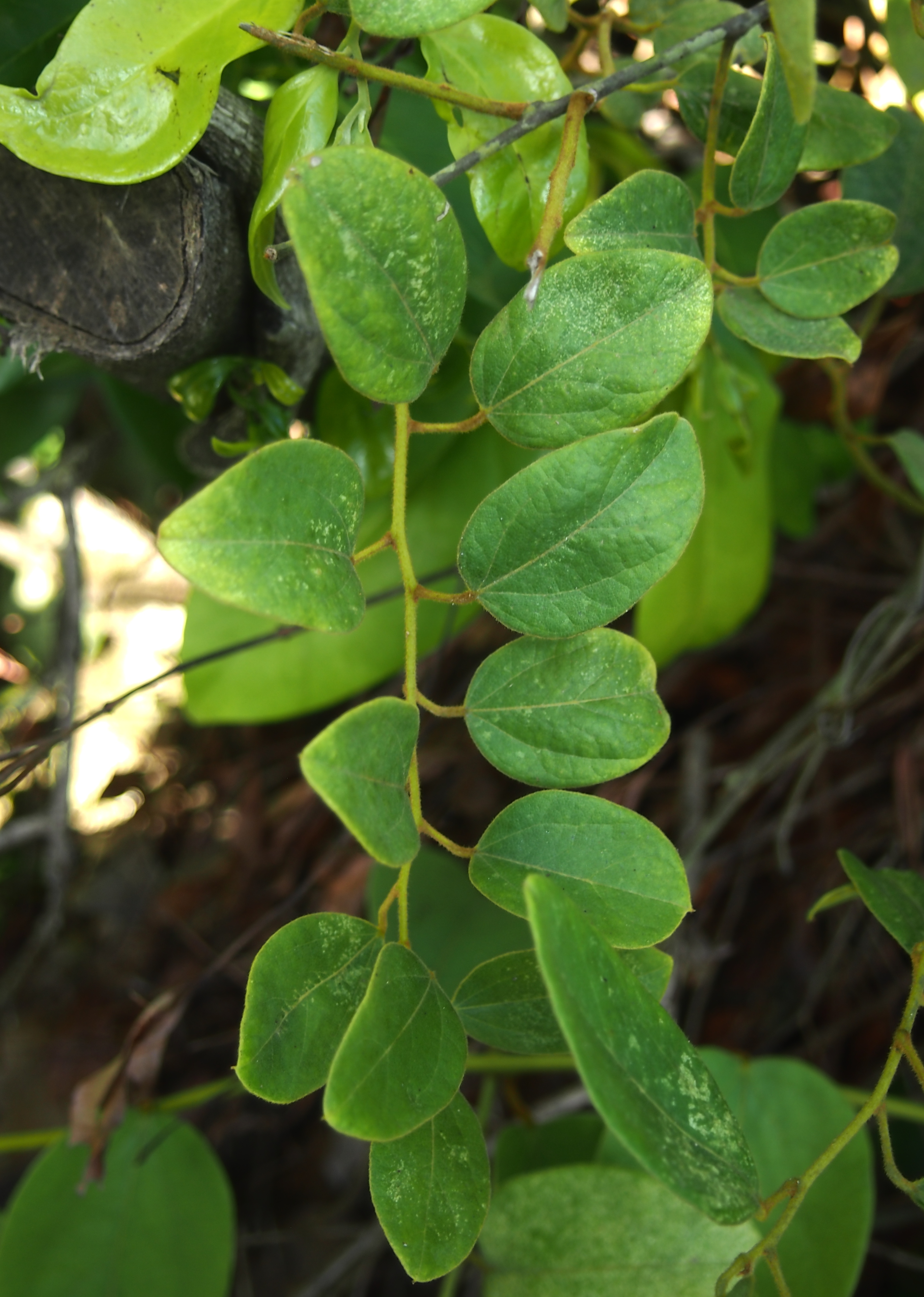
- Foliage

Conservation status
- Least Concern (NCA)

Scientific classification
- Kingdom: Plantae
- Clade: Tracheophytes
- Clade: Angiosperms
- Clade: Eudicots
- Order: Ranunculales
- Family: Menispermaceae
- Genus: Hypserpa
- Species: H. decumbens

Binomial name
- Hypserpa decumbens (Benth.) Diels

Synonyms
- Adelioides decumbens (Benth.) Banks & Sol. ex Britten; Adeliopsis decumbens Benth.

= Hypserpa decumbens =

Species of flowering plant

Hypserpa decumbens, commonly known as hairy Hypserpa, is a species of vine in the family Menispermaceae with a stem diameter up to 14 cm (5.5 in). It is endemic to Australia, ranging from the Northern Territory, through coastal Queensland to the far northeast corner of New South Wales. It grows in rainforest at altitudes from sea level to about 1,150 m (3,770 ft), and has the conservation status of least concern.
