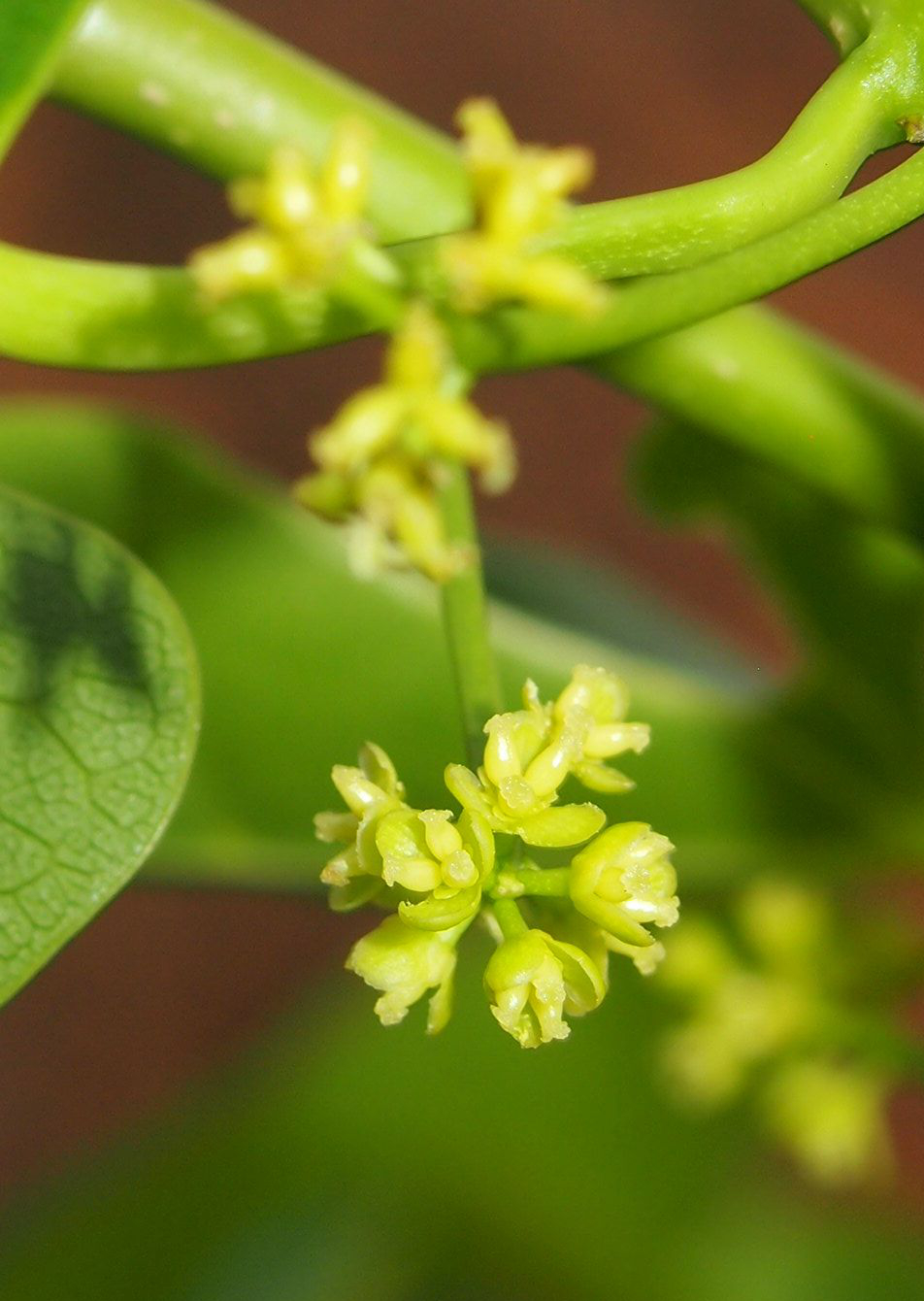

Scientific classification
- Kingdom: Plantae
- Clade: Tracheophytes
- Clade: Angiosperms
- Clade: Eudicots
- Order: Ranunculales
- Family: Menispermaceae
- Genus: Tinospora
- Species: T. smilacina

Binomial name
- Tinospora smilacina Benth.

= Tinospora smilacina =

Species of flowering plant

Tinospora smilacina is a woody vine in the Menispermaceae family. It was first described by George Bentham in 1861.

The Walmajarri name for this plant is Wararrkaji.
