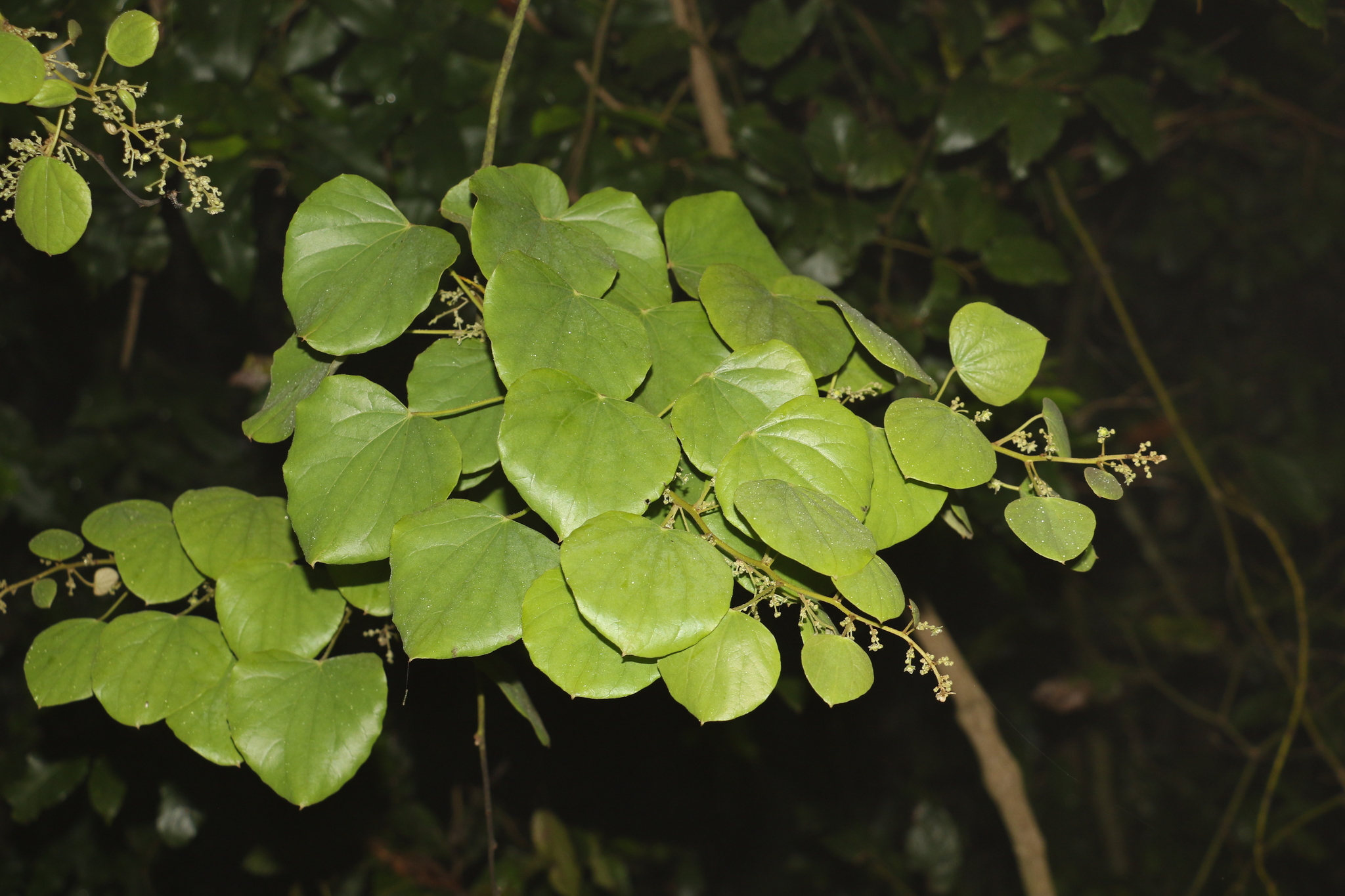

Scientific classification
- Kingdom: Plantae
- Clade: Tracheophytes
- Clade: Angiosperms
- Clade: Eudicots
- Order: Ranunculales
- Family: Menispermaceae
- Genus: Legnephora
- Species: L. moorei

Binomial name
- Legnephora moorei (F.Muell.) Miers

= Legnephora moorei =

Round-leaf vine

Species of flowering plant

Legnephora moorei, the round-leaf vine, is a species of flowering plant in the family Menispermaceae. It is endemic to the rainforests of Queensland and New South Wales, Australia. Round-leaf vine is a tall and large leafed climber usually noticed by fallen leaves on the rainforest floor. The southernmost limit of natural distribution is at Yatteyattah Nature Reserve on the south coast of New South Wales. The species is one of the many named after Charles Moore. The stem of the vine can go up to 9 cm.
