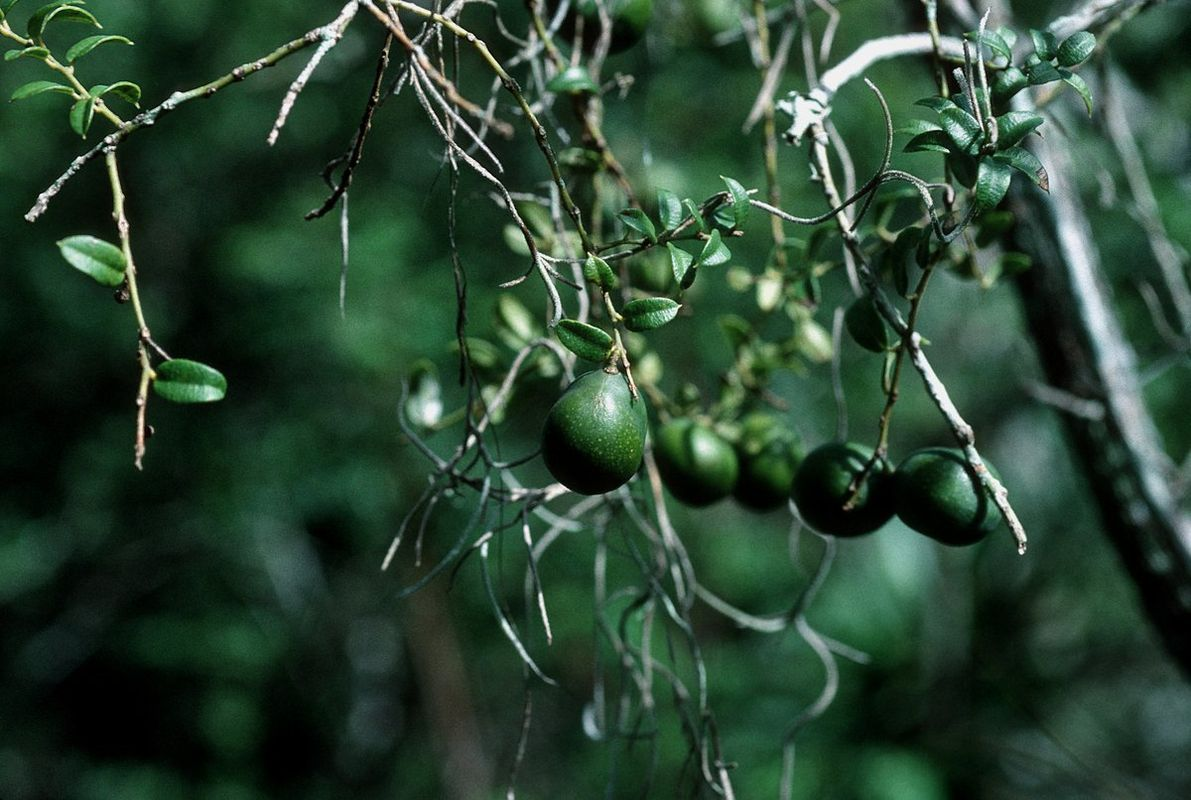

Conservation status
- Near Threatened (IUCN 3.1)

Scientific classification
- Kingdom: Plantae
- Clade: Embryophytes
- Clade: Tracheophytes
- Clade: Spermatophytes
- Clade: Angiosperms
- Clade: Eudicots
- Order: Ranunculales
- Family: Menispermaceae
- Genus: Hyperbaena
- Species: H. brevipes

Binomial name
- Hyperbaena brevipes Urb. & Ekman

Synonyms
- Hyperbaena pruinosa Urb. & Ekman

= Hyperbaena brevipes =

Species of flowering plant

Hyperbaena brevipes is a species of flowering plant in the family Menispermaceae. It is a shrub or small tree with leathery leaves, green to yellow flowers, and blue, purple, or red fruits. The species is endemic to Hispaniola.

Hyperbaena brevipes was described in 1927, and has been listed as Near Threatened by the IUCN.

== Taxonomy ==
The species was described by Ignatz Urban and Erik Leonard Ekman in 1927.

== Distribution ==
Hyperbaena brevipes is native to the wet tropial biome of Hispaniola. It is endemic to the island. The species grows in northern Haiti, the northwestern Dominican Republic, and the south-eastern Dominican Republic. Its estimated extent of occurrence is 33,347 square kilometres (12,875 sq mi).

The species grows on limestone and serpentine soil, in dry and moist forests, and in beach thickets. It is present at elevations of up to 400 metres (1,300 ft).

== Description ==
Hyperbaena brevipes is a shrub or small tree that grows up to 3 metres (9.8 ft) high. The branches are grey and drooping. The wood is relatively dense.

The leaves are leathery, oblong to ovate, 1–10.5 centimetres (0.39–4.13 in) long, and 0.4–6 centimetres (0.16–2.36 in) wide. The margin is smooth, and usually undulating. The leaf stem is 0.2–1.5 centimetres (0.079–0.591 in) long.

The male inflorescences are usually solitary, and rarely in clusters. The inflorescence stem is 0.1–0.4 millimetres (0.0039–0.0157 in) long. The flower stems are 0.3–2 millimetres (0.012–0.079 in) long. The male flowers are pale green to pale yellow, and have six sepals in two groups. The outer sepals are obovate, around 0.7 millimetres (0.028 in) long, and around 0.7 millimetres (0.028 in) wide. The inner inner sepals are broadly ovate, around 1.2 millimetres (0.047 in) long, and around 1.2 millimetres (0.047 in) wide. The male flowers have six petals in two groups. The petals are obovate, around 0.8 millimetres (0.031 in) long, and around 0.8 millimetres (0.031 in) wide. The male flowers have six stamens.

The stems of female flowers are 0–3 millimetres (0.00–0.12 in) long.

The fruits are round, glaucous, blue to purplish-red, 15–25 millimetres (0.59–0.98 in) long, 12–21 millimetres (0.47–0.83 in) wide.

Specimens of Hyperbaena brevipes may have been confused with Hyperbaena laurifolia.

== Conservation ==
In 2023, the IUCN assessed Hyperbaena brevipes as Near Threatened. A 2016 assessment under the synonym Hyperbaena pruinosa listed the species as Critically Endangered in the Dominican Republic, though this did not consider its full range.

The species is threatened by habitat loss, invasive species (including Vachellia farnesiana and Prosopis juliflora), exploitation of the wood for charcoal, and climate change. The species is present in Cotubanamá National Park.

== Nomenclature ==
In French, the species is known as Bénuette. In Spanish, it is known as Chicharron.
