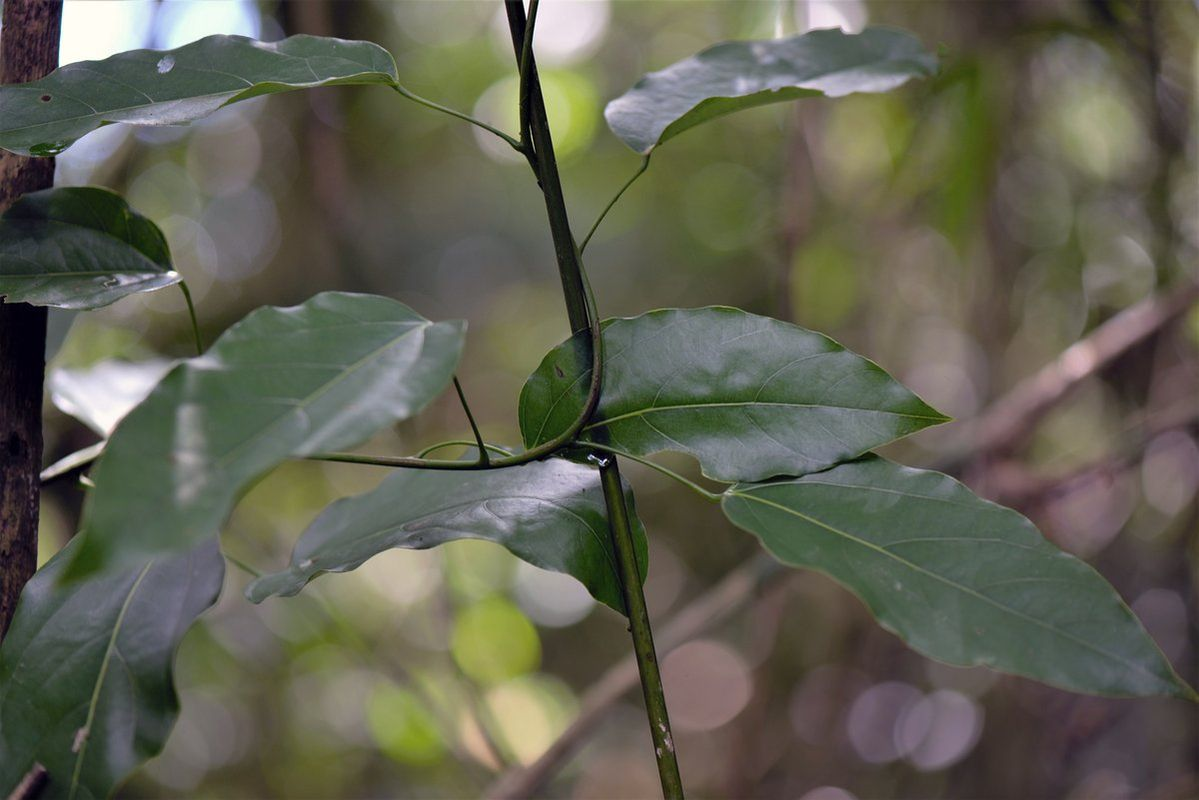

Scientific classification
- Kingdom: Plantae
- Clade: Embryophytes
- Clade: Tracheophytes
- Clade: Spermatophytes
- Clade: Angiosperms
- Clade: Eudicots
- Order: Ranunculales
- Family: Menispermaceae
- Genus: Hyperbaena
- Species: H. domingensis

Binomial name
- Hyperbaena domingensis (DC.) Benth.

Synonyms
- Synonymy: Cocculus domingensis DC.; Menispermum domingense (DC.) Spreng.; Pachygone domingensis (DC.) Eichler; Anelasma jamaicense Miers ex Benth.; Anelasma minutiflora Sagot ex Diels; Anelasma minutiflorum Sagot ex Benth.; Cocculus paniculiger Mart.; Hyperbaena graciliflora Miers; Hyperbaena hostmannii Miers; Hyperbaena moricandii Miers; Hyperbaena nemoralis Miers; Hyperbaena reticulata Benth.; Hyperbaena retinervis Miers; Hyperbaena rotundiuscula Miers; Hyperbaena tweediei Miers ex Benth.; Pachygone graciliflora (Miers) Sagot

= Hyperbaena domingensis =

Species of flowering plant

Hyperbaena domingensis, commonly known as forest snakevine, is a species of flowering plant in the family Menispermaceae. It is a climbing shrub, tree, or vine, with greenish-yellow, greenish-brown, or white flowers. The fruits are green to purple drupes.

Hyperbaena domingensis has a broad native range in the Caribbean and South America. It was first described in 1817.

== Taxonomy ==
The species was first described by Augustin Pyramus de Candolle in 1817. De Candolle placed it in the genus Cocculus. In 1861, George Bentham placed the species in Hyperbaena. The delimitation of the species has historically been unclear. Hyperbaena prioriana and Hyperbaena valida were formerly considered part of Hyperbaena domingensis, but were later recognised as distinct species.

Hyperbaena domingensis is the type species of Hyperbaena.

== Distribution ==
Hyperbaena domingensis is primarily native to the seasonally dry tropical biome. It grows in the Caribbean and South America. It occurs in Bolivia, Brazil, Colombia, Cuba, the Dominican Republic, Ecuador, French Guiana, Guyana, Haiti, Jamaica, the Leeward Islands, Peru, Puerto Rico, Suriname, Trinidad and Tobago, Venezuela, and the Windward Islands.

The species grows in swampy areas and wet forests, at elevations of 1,500 metres (4,900 ft).

== Description ==
Hyperbaena domingensis is a perennial climbing shrub, tree, or trailing woody vine. It can grow up to 14 metres (46 ft) long. The branches are grey, and striped.

The leaves are leathery, 4.5–20 centimetres (1.8–7.9 in) long, 2.5–12 centimetres (0.98–4.72 in) wide, narrowly or broadly ovate, and have smooth margins. The leaf stems are 1–6 centimetres (0.39–2.36 in) long.

The male inflorescences are usually in clusters, and grow on 1–3.5 centimetres (0.39–1.38 in) long stems. The flower stems are 0.5–4 millimetres (0.020–0.157 in) long. The male flowers are white, greenish-brown, or greenish-yellow, and usually have six stamens. They have six sepals in two groups. The outer sepals are obovate, around 0.6 millimetres (0.024 in) long, and 0.4 millimetres (0.016 in) wide. The inner sepals are broadly ovate, around 0.8 millimetres (0.031 in) long, and around 0.7 millimetres (0.028 in) wide. The male flowers have six petals in two groups. The petals are obovate to orbicular, around 0.5 millimetres (0.020 in) long, and around 0.5 millimetres (0.020 in) wide.

The female inflorescences are usually solitary, and grow on 1–2.8 centimetres (0.39–1.10 in) long stems. The flower stems are 1–15 millimetres (0.039–0.591 in) long. The female flowers are greenish-yellow, and have six sepals in two groups. The female flowers usually have three carpels. The outer sepals are obovate, around 0.8 millimetres (0.031 in) long, and around 0.5 millimetres (0.020 in) wide. The inner sepals are broadly ovate, around 1.2 millimetres (0.047 in) long, and around 1 millimetre (0.039 in) wide. The female flowers have six broadly obovate petals in two groups, around 0.6 millimetres (0.024 in) long, and around 0.4 millimetres (0.016 in) wide.

The fruits are narrowly to broadly obovoid drupes, which are green to purple, 12–23 millimetres (0.47–0.91 in) long, and 9–12 millimetres (0.35–0.47 in) wide. The epicarp is smooth. The endocarp and seed are horseshoe shaped.

== Uses ==
Hyperbaena domingensis is used for food and medicine.

== Nomenclature ==
In English, Hyperbaena domingensis is commonly known as "forest snakevine". In Portuguese, the species is known as uva-do-mato, uva-de-gentio, or cipó-bala.
