= Hyperbaena oblongifolia =

Scientific classification
- Kingdom: Plantae
- Clade: Tracheophytes
- Clade: Angiosperms
- Clade: Eudicots
- Order: Ranunculales
- Family: Menispermaceae
- Genus: Hyperbaena
- Species: H. oblongifolia

Binomial name
- Hyperbaena oblongifolia (Eichler) Chodat & Hassl.

Synonyms
- Pachygone oblongifolia Eichler; Cocculus banisteriifolius A.Rich. ex A.St.-Hil. & Tul.; Cocculus oblongifolius Mart.; Hyperbaena banisteriifolia Miers

Species of flowering plant

Hyperbaena oblongifolia is a species of flowering plant in the family Menispermaceae. It is a climbing shrub with membranous leaves, greenish-yellow flowers, and green fruits. The species is native to Argentina, Brazil, and Paraguay, and was described in 1864.

== Taxonomy ==
The species was described by August W. Eichler in 1864, and placed in the genus Pachygone. In 1903, Robert Hippolyte Chodat and Emil Hassler moved the species to the genus Hyperbaena.

== Distribution ==
Hyperbaena oblongifolia is native to the seasonally dry tropical biome of north-east Argentina, Brazil (north, south and south-east), and Paraguay.

== Description ==
Hyperbaena oblongifolia is a climbing shrub with cylindrical branches.

The leaves are ovate to oblong-ovate, membranous, 3.5–13 centimetres (1.4–5.1 in) long, and 1.5–6.5 centimetres (0.59–2.56 in) wide. The edges are smooth and undulating, and the leaf stems are 1–3 centimetres (0.39–1.18 in) long.

The male inflorescences are solitary or clustered spikes or racemes that grow on 1–3 millimetres (0.039–0.118 in) stems. The flower stems are up to 0.5 millimetres (0.020 in) long. The male flowers are greenish-yellow, and have six sepals. The outer sepals are obovate, around 1.2 millimetres (0.047 in) long, and around 0.7 millimetres (0.028 in) wide. The inner sepals are obovate, around 1.8 millimetres (0.071 in) long, and around 1 millimetre (0.039 in) wide. The male flowers have six petals, which are obovate, around 1 millimetre (0.039 in) long, and around 0.6 millimetres (0.024 in) wide. The male flowers have six stamens.

The female inflorescences are usually solitary spikes or racemes that grow on 0.1–1.7 centimetres (0.039–0.669 in) long stems. The flower stems are up to 6 millimetres (0.24 in) long. The female flowers are greenish-yellow, and have six sepals. The outer sepals are ovate to obovate-lanceolate, around 1.4 millimetres (0.055 in) long, and around 0.9 millimetres (0.035 in) long. The inner sepals are broadly ovate to obovate, around 1.7 millimetres (0.067 in) long, and around 1.2 millimetres (0.047 in) wide. The female flowers have six petals, which are ovate to obovate, around 1 millimetre (0.039 in) long, and around 0.8 millimetres (0.031 in) wide. The female flowers have two to four carpels.

The fruits are green, obovoid, 17–20 millimetres (0.67–0.79 in) long, and 10–13 millimetres (0.39–0.51 in) wide.
