= Jardin d'acclimatation du Mourillon =

Botanical garden in Provence-Alpes-Côte d'Azur, France

Coordinates: 43.1088°N 5.9464°E

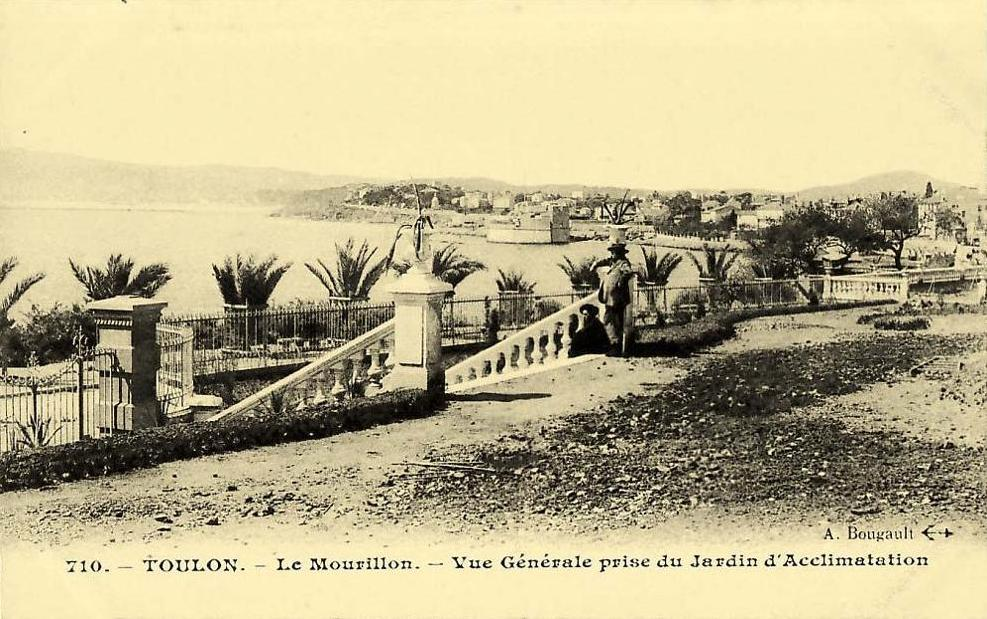
View from Jardin d'acclimatation du Mourillon in the 1900s.

The Jardin d'acclimatation du Mourillon (8,000 m²) is a municipal botanical garden located at 1053 Littoral Frédéric Mistral, Le Mourillon, Toulon, Var, Provence-Alpes-Côte d'Azur, France. It is open daily without charge.

The garden was founded in 1887 under the direction of the Société d'Horticulture et d'Acclimatation du Var, and opened to the public in 1889. Badly damaged during bombardments in 1944, it has been rehabilitated under municipal management starting in 1947, with renovations in 1988 and again in 1998 to celebrate the garden's centenary.

Today the garden still contains numerous trees planted in the early 1900s. It contains good collections of palm trees (Butia, Phoenix canariensis, Washingtonia, hemp palm, and dwarf palm), evergreens (camphor, Cocculus laurifolius, Photinia serrulata, mimosa, Lagunaria patersonia, and Grevillea), and deciduous trees (catalpa, white poplar, Koelreuteria paniculata, Maclura pomifera). Its plantings include Liliaceae (agave, cordyline, dasylirion, dracaena, yucca), and cactus and cycads (Cycas, Dioon, Encephalartos), as well as Cocculus laurifolius, euonymus, oleander, etc.

The garden also contains a bas-relief profile of poet Frédéric Mistral, marble statue of German poet Heinrich Heine sculpted by Danish sculptor Louis Hasselriis (1844-1912) for Elisabeth of Bavaria, and a monument commemorating sailors missing at sea.

== See also ==
- List of botanical gardens in France
