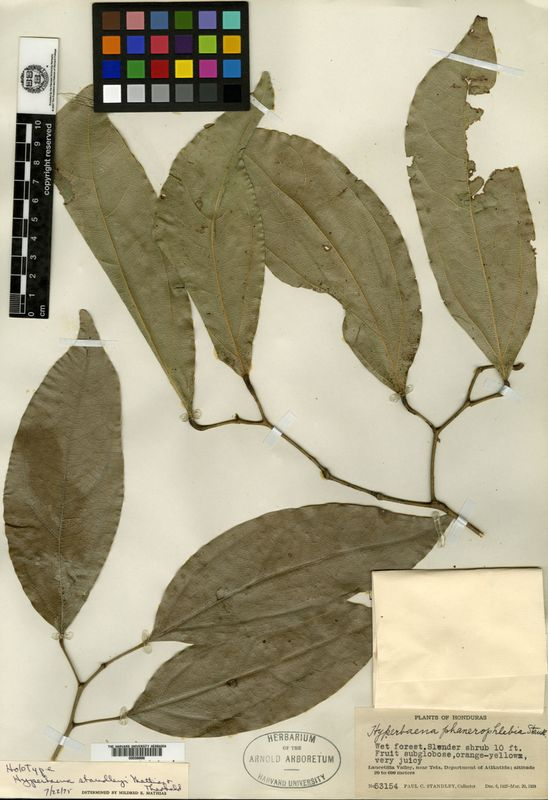

Scientific classification
- Kingdom: Plantae
- Clade: Embryophytes
- Clade: Tracheophytes
- Clade: Spermatophytes
- Clade: Angiosperms
- Clade: Eudicots
- Order: Ranunculales
- Family: Menispermaceae
- Genus: Hyperbaena
- Species: H. standleyi

Binomial name
- Hyperbaena standleyi Mathias & W.L.Theob.

= Hyperbaena standleyi =

Species of flowering plant

Hyperbaena standleyi is a species of flowering plant in the family Menispermaceae. It is a shrub or tree with leathery leaves, and orange-yellow fruits. The species is native to Mexico and Honduras, and was described in 1981.

== Taxonomy ==
Hyperbaena standleyi was described by Mildred E. Mathias and William Louis Theobald in 1981. The description was published in Brittonia.

The type specimen was collected in the Lancetilla valley, near Tela, Honduras. It was found in a wet forest, at an elevation of 60–200 metres (200–660 ft).

== Distribution ==
Hyperbaena standleyi is native to the wet tropical biome of Mexico (Oaxaca and Chiapas) and Honduras.

== Description ==
Hyperbaena standleyi is a shrub or small tree that grows up to 5 metres (16 ft) high. The leaves are leathery, ovate, 8.5–21 centimetres (3.3–8.3 in) long, and 3.5–8 centimetres (1.4–3.1 in) wide. The leaf stems are 1–3 centimetres (0.39–1.18 in) long. The mature fruits are orange-yellow, round, 2.5 centimetres (0.98 in) long, and 2 centimetres (0.79 in) wide.

Hyperbaena standleyi appears closely related to Hyperbaena mexicana, though the species differ in their leaf veins.
