= Herodotia =

Heredotia may refer to:

- Herodotia (wasp) – Herodotia Girault, 1931 – a genus of fig wasps
- Herodotia (plant) – Herodotia Urb. & Ekman [1826] – a genus of plants in the family Asteraceae
