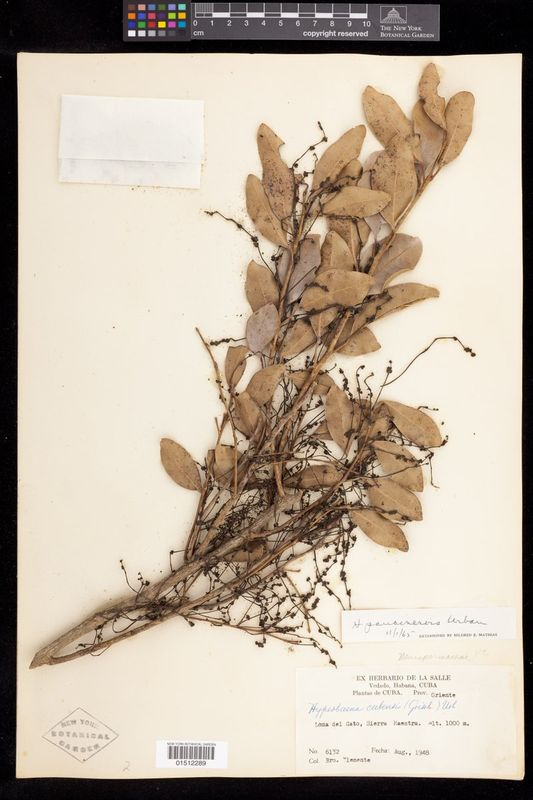

Scientific classification
- Kingdom: Plantae
- Clade: Embryophytes
- Clade: Tracheophytes
- Clade: Spermatophytes
- Clade: Angiosperms
- Clade: Eudicots
- Order: Ranunculales
- Family: Menispermaceae
- Genus: Hyperbaena
- Species: H. axilliflora

Binomial name
- Hyperbaena axilliflora Urb.

Synonyms
- Anomospermum axilliflorum Griseb.; Pachygone axilliflorum (Griseb.) M.Gómez; Hyperbaena angustifolia (A.Gray ex Griseb.) Urb.; Hyperbaena longiuscula Miers; Hyperbaena longiuscula var. clements Moldenke; Hyperbaena obovata Urb.; Hyperbaena paucinervis Urb.; Pachygone cubensis var. angustifolia A.Gray ex Griseb.

= Hyperbaena axilliflora =

Species of flowering plant

Hyperbaena axilliflora is a species of flowering plant in the family Menispermaceae. It is a shrub or small tree with leathery leaves, greenish-yellow flowers, and round green fruits. The species is native to Cuba, and was described in 1899.

== Taxonomy ==
The species was described by Ignatz Urban in 1899.

== Distribution ==
Hyperbaena axilliflora is native to the wet tropical biome of central and eastern Cuba. It grows in woods, pinelands, and thickets, at elevations of up to 1,000 metres (3,300 ft).

== Description ==
Hyperbaena axilliflora is a shrub or small tree that grows up to 6 metres (20 ft) high. The branches are smooth and brown. The leaves are leathery, 3–17 centimetres (1.2–6.7 in) long, and 1.5–6 centimetres (0.59–2.36 in) wide. The leaf edges are smooth, or slightly undulating. The leaf stem is 0.5–2 centimetres (0.20–0.79 in) long.

The male inflorescences are solitary or in clusters, and grow on 0.2–2.3 centimetres (0.079–0.906 in) long stems. The male flowers are greenish-yellow, and have six sepals in two series. The outer sepals are obovate, around 1.2 millimetres (0.047 in) long, and around 0.9 millimetres (0.035 in) wide. The inner sepals are broadly obovate to ovate, around 1.8 millimetres (0.071 in) long, and around 1.2 millimetres (0.047 in) wide. The male flowers have six petals in two groups. The petals are obovate, around 1 millimetre (0.039 in) long, and around 0.7 millimetres (0.028 in) wide. The male flowers have six stamens.

The female inflorescences are usually solitary, and grow on 0.1–1.5 centimetres (0.039–0.591 in) long stems. The female flowers grow on 1–2 millimetres (0.039–0.079 in) stems.

The fruits are green, roughly spherical, 9–12 millimetres (0.35–0.47 in) long, and 9–12 millimetres (0.35–0.47 in) wide.

Hyperbaena axilliflora has been confused with Hyperbaena cubensis. The leaves of the two species differ in shape, and the former grows at higher elevations.
