= Hyperbaena undulata =

Conservation status
- Vulnerable (IUCN 3.1)

Scientific classification
- Kingdom: Plantae
- Clade: Tracheophytes
- Clade: Angiosperms
- Clade: Eudicots
- Order: Ranunculales
- Family: Menispermaceae
- Genus: Hyperbaena
- Species: H. undulata

Binomial name
- Hyperbaena undulata Urb. & Ekman

Species of flowering plant

Hyperbaena undulata is a species of flowering plant in the family Menispermaceae. It is a small tree with leathery leaves, and is native to the Caribbean. The species was described in 1930, and is listed as Vulnerable by the IUCN.

== Taxonomy ==
The species was described by Ignatz Urban and Erik Leonard Ekman in 1930.

== Distribution ==
Hyperbaena undulata is native to the wet tropical biome of Haiti. It grows on limestone in coastal areas, at elevations of up to 200 metres (660 ft).

Hyperbaena undulata was considered endemic to the Massif de la Hotte until 1981, when it was found on the south-east coast of Cuba. It has also been found in western Jamaica.

== Description ==
Hyperbaena undulata is a small tree that grows up to 7 metres (23 ft) high. The branches are cylindrical.

The leaves are leathery, oblong to narrowly ovate, 9–18 centimetres (3.5–7.1 in) long, 4–6 centimetres (1.6–2.4 in) wide, and have smooth, undulating margins. The leaf stems are 2–5 centimetres (0.79–1.97 in) long.

== Conservation ==
In 2019, the IUCN assessed Hyperbaena undulata as Vulnerable. It is threatened by habitat loss, climate change, and invasive species.
