= Herodotia haitiensis =

Scientific classification
- Kingdom: Plantae
- Clade: Tracheophytes
- Clade: Angiosperms
- Clade: Eudicots
- Clade: Asterids
- Order: Asterales
- Family: Asteraceae
- Subfamily: Asteroideae
- Tribe: Senecioneae
- Genus: Herodotia; Urb. & Ekman
- Species: H. haitiensis

Binomial name
- Herodotia haitiensis Urb. & Ekman

Species of flowering plant

Herodotia is a genus of flowering plants in the daisy family.

Species

There is only one known species, Herodotia haitiensis, found only in Haiti.

formerly included

now in other genera: Ekmaniopappus, Nesampelos

- Herodotia alainii J.Jiménez Alm. - Nesampelos alainii (J.Jiménez Alm.) B.Nord.
- Herodotia mikanioides Urb. & Ekman - Ekmaniopappus mikanioides (Urb. & Ekman) Borhidi
