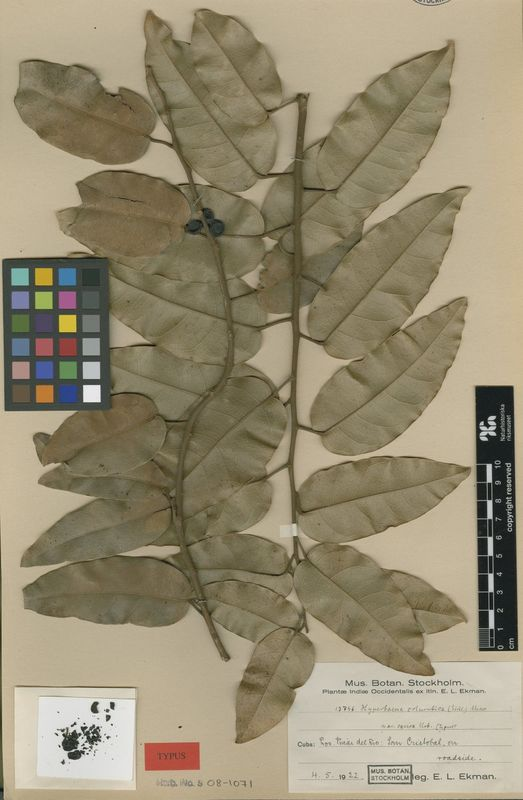

Scientific classification
- Kingdom: Plantae
- Clade: Embryophytes
- Clade: Tracheophytes
- Clade: Spermatophytes
- Clade: Angiosperms
- Clade: Eudicots
- Order: Ranunculales
- Family: Menispermaceae
- Genus: Hyperbaena
- Species: H. columbica

Binomial name
- Hyperbaena columbica (Eichler) Miers

Synonyms
- Pachygone columbica Eichler; Hyperbaena columbica var. excisa Urb.; Hyperbaena crebriflora Miers

= Hyperbaena columbica =

Species of flowering plant

Hyperbaena columbica is a species of flowering plant in the family Menispermaceae. It is a shrub with leathery leaves, greenish-yellow flowers, and round fruits. The species was described in 1864. It is native to Cuba, but was named after Colombia.

== Taxonomy ==
In 1864, August W. Eichler described the species as Pachygone columbica. In 1867, John Miers moved the species from Pachygone to Hyperbaena.

== Distribution ==
Hyperbaena columbica is native to the wet tropical biome of Cuba. It grows in thickets in Pinar del Río Province.

== Description ==
Hyperbaena columbica is a shrub up to 3 metres (9.8 ft) high. The branches are cylindrical, striped, and can have long rigid hairs.

The leaves are leathery, oblong to ovate, 3.5–11 centimetres (1.4–4.3 in) long, and 1.5–6.5 centimetres (0.59–2.56 in) wide. The leaves are smooth, and have smooth wavy edges. The leaf stems are 1–3 centimetres (0.39–1.18 in) long.

The male inflorescences are clustered panicles, which grow on stalks up to 1 millimetre (0.039 in) long. The male flowers grow on 1.5–5 millimetres (0.059–0.197 in) stalks. The male flowers are greenish-yellow, and have six sepals, which are arranged in groups of two. The outer sepals are ovate, around 2 millimetres (0.079 in) long, and 1.2 millimetres (0.047 in) wide. The inner sepals are around 2 millimetres (0.079 in) long, and 1.6 millimetres (0.063 in) wide. The male flowers have six petals, which are obovate, around 1 millimetre (0.039 in) long, and 0.7 millimetres (0.028 in) wide. The male flowers have six stamens.

The female inflorescences are usually solitary, and grow on 0.1–5 millimetres (0.0039–0.1969 in) stems. The female flowers have 1–5 millimetres (0.039–0.197 in) stems. The female flowers are greenish-yellow, and have six sepals arranged in groups of two. The outer sepals are narrowly ovate, around 1.3 millimetres (0.051 in), and around 0.9 millimetres (0.035 in) wide. The inner sepals are broadly ovate to orbicular, around 1.3 millimetres (0.051 in) long, and around 1.3 millimetres (0.051 in) wide. The female flowers have six petals, which are obovate, around 0.8 millimetres (0.031 in) long, and around 0.5 millimetres (0.020 in) wide. The female flowers have three or four carpels.

The fruits are obovoid to roughly spherical, 10–17 millimetres (0.39–0.67 in) long, and 8–13 millimetres (0.31–0.51 in) wide.

== Etymology ==
The specific epithet refers to Colombia, as August W. Eichler mistakenly thought that the type specimen was collected there.
