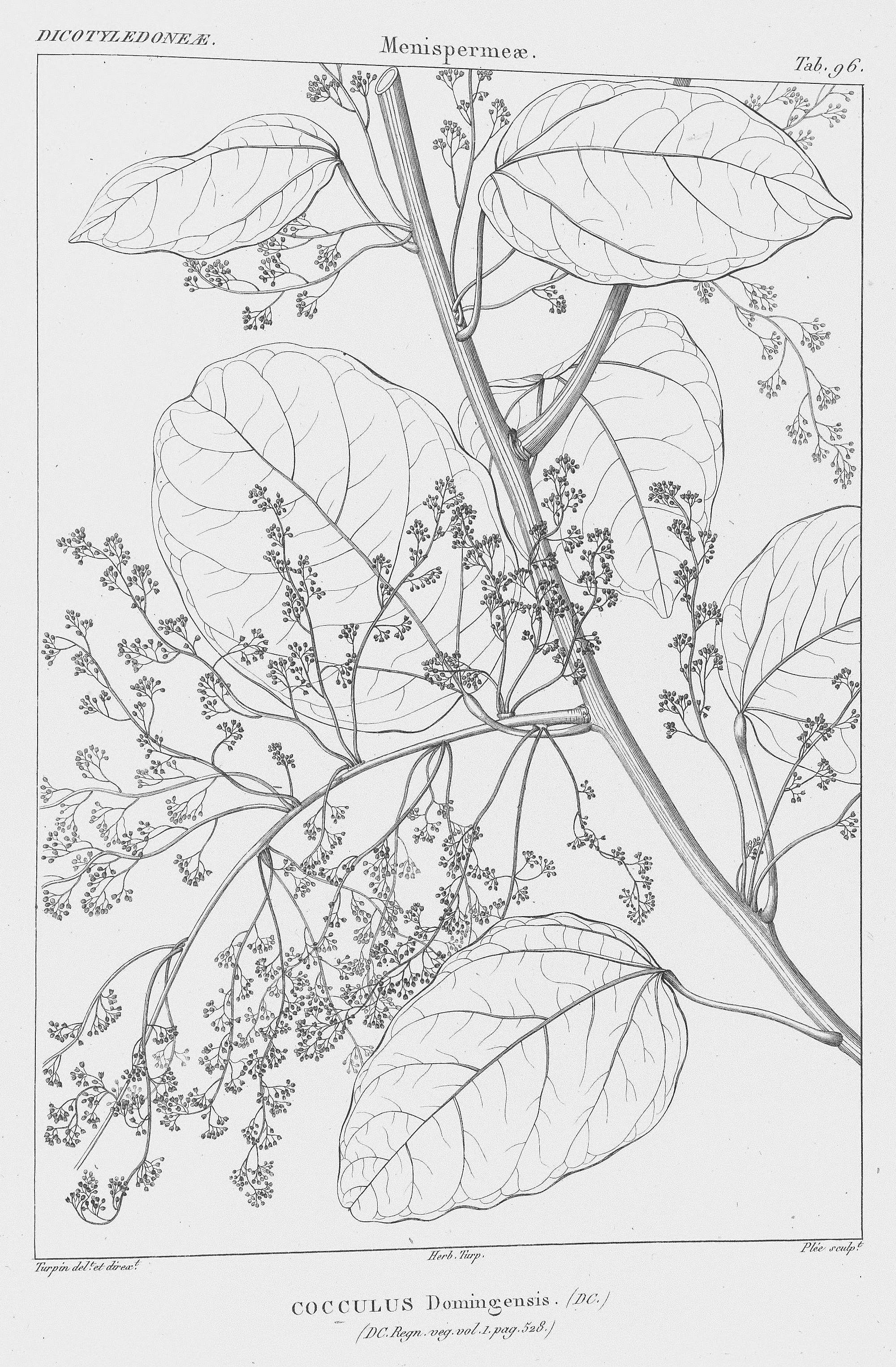
- Illustration of Hyperbaena domingensis (orig. Cocculus domingensis)

Scientific classification
- Kingdom: Plantae
- Clade: Embryophytes
- Clade: Tracheophytes
- Clade: Spermatophytes
- Clade: Angiosperms
- Clade: Eudicots
- Order: Ranunculales
- Family: Menispermaceae
- Genus: Hyperbaena; Miers ex Benth. (1861), nom. cons.

Type species
- Hyperbaena domingensis (DC.) Benth.

Species
- 23; see text

Synonyms
- Alina Adans. (1763); Vimen P.Browne (1756), not validly publ.

= Hyperbaena =

Genus of flowering plants

Hyperbaena is a genus of plants in family Menispermaceae. It includes 23 species native to the tropical Americas, ranging from Cuba and southern Mexico to northeastern Argentina. The genus was named in 1851, and consists of lianas, shrubs, and trees, with greenish-yellow flowers. The fruits are drupes.

== Taxonomy ==
In 1851, John Miers named Hyperbaena, proposing it for a plant discovered in Rio de Janeiro. Miers gave no formal description of the genus. August W. Eichler placed all species of Hyperbaena in the genus Pachygone, which Miers deemed incorrect.

In 1861, George Bentham recognised Hyperbaena as valid. Bentham fused several species into Hyperbaena reticulata, a name which is now a synonym of Hyperbaena domingensis.

In 1867, Miers published the first detailed description of the genus.

== Species ==
23 species are accepted.

- Hyperbaena allenii Standl.
- Hyperbaena axilliflora (Griseb.) Urb.
- Hyperbaena brevipes Urb. & Ekman
- Hyperbaena columbica (Eichler) Miers
- Hyperbaena cubensis (Griseb.) Urb.
- Hyperbaena domingensis (DC.) Benth.
- Hyperbaena eladioana Q.Jiménez
- Hyperbaena hassleri Diels
- Hyperbaena ilicifolia Standl.
- Hyperbaena jalcomulcensis E.Pérez & Cast.-Campos
- Hyperbaena laurifolia (Poir.) Urb.
- Hyperbaena leptobotryosa (Donn.Sm.) Standl.
- Hyperbaena lindmanii Urb.
- Hyperbaena mexicana Miers
- Hyperbaena oblongifolia (Eichler) Chodat & Hassl.
- Hyperbaena prioriana Miers
- Hyperbaena smilacina Standl.
- Hyperbaena standleyi Mathias & W.T.Theob.
- Hyperbaena tonduzii Diels
- Hyperbaena undulata Urb. & Ekman
- Hyperbaena valida Miers
- Hyperbaena vulcania Standl. & Steyerm.
- Hyperbaena winzerlingii Standl.

== Description ==
Hyperbaena are slender or woody lianas, shrubs or trees, that grow up to 15 metres (49 ft) high. The branches are grey or greyish-brown, and usually cylindrical. The leaves are simple, leathery, and arranged alternately. They are narrowly oblong to obovate in shape.

The male inflorescences are often clustered panicles, or unbranched spikes. The male flowers have six stamens. The female inflorescences are solitary or in clusters, and arranged into panicles, or unbranched spikes. The female flowers have two to five carpels.

Both the male and female flowers are white to greenish-white, yellow or brownish, and usually have six sepals arranged in two groups. The outer sepals are usually smaller than the inner sepals.

The fruits are drupes, which can be green, yellow, orange, bluish to redish purple, or black. The fruits can be roughly spherical or egg-shaped. The exocarp is thin and leathery. The endocarp and seed are inversely U-shaped. There is no endosperm.
