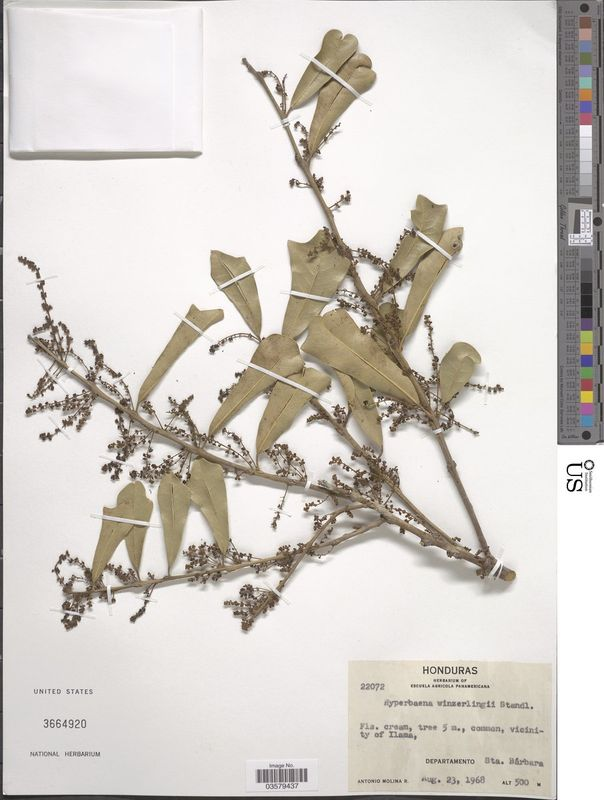

Conservation status
- Least Concern (IUCN 3.1)

Scientific classification
- Kingdom: Plantae
- Clade: Embryophytes
- Clade: Tracheophytes
- Clade: Spermatophytes
- Clade: Angiosperms
- Clade: Eudicots
- Order: Ranunculales
- Family: Menispermaceae
- Genus: Hyperbaena
- Species: H. winzerlingii

Binomial name
- Hyperbaena winzerlingii Standl.

= Hyperbaena winzerlingii =

Species of flowering plant

Hyperbaena winzerlingii is a species of flowering plant in the family Menispermaceae. It is a shrub or tree with leathery leaves, greenish-yellow flowers, and round fruits. The species is native to Belize, Honduras, and Mexico.

Hyperbaena winzerlingii was described in 1927, and is listed as of Least Concern by the IUCN.

== Taxonomy ==
The species was described by Paul Carpenter Standley in 1927.

== Distribution ==
Hyperbaena winzerlingii is native to the wet tropical biome of Belize, Honduras, and south-east Mexico (Campeche, Quintana Roo, and Yucatán). It may be present in Nicaragua. The species' extent of occurrence is around 192,180.022 square kilometres (74,201.121 sq mi).

The species grows in lowland scrub forests and tropical deciduous forests. It is present at elevations of up to 500 metres (1,600 ft).

== Description ==
Hyperbaena winzerlingii is a shrub or tree that grows up to 10 metres (33 ft) high. The trunk is up to 19 centimetres (7.5 in) wide. The branches are cylindical, and the older branches are grey.

The leaves are leathery, oblanceolate to angulate-obovate, 3–13 centimetres (1.2–5.1 in) long, and 1.5–4 centimetres (0.59–1.57 in) wide. The leaves have a prominent midvein. The leaf stem is 0.5–1 centimetre (0.20–0.39 in) long.

The male inflorescences are solitary or in clusters. They grow on 0.4–1.7 centimetres (0.16–0.67 in) stems. The flower stems are 1–3 millimetres (0.039–0.118 in) long. The flowers are greenish-yellow, and have six sepals in two groups. The outer sepals are obovate, around 1 millimetre (0.039 in) long, and around 0.5 millimetres (0.020 in) wide. The inner sepals are broadly obovate, around 1.2 millimetres (0.047 in) long, and around 1.2 millimetres (0.047 in) wide. There are six orbicular petals, which are around 0.5 millimetres (0.020 in) long and wide. The male flowers have three to five stamens.

The female inflorescences are usually solitary, and grow on 0.3–1.1 centimetres (0.12–0.43 in) stems. The flower stems are 1–3 millimetres (0.039–0.118 in) long.

The fruits are round, 15–24 millimetres (0.59–0.94 in) long, and 18–23 millimetres (0.71–0.91 in) wide. The fruits are smooth, or have sparse soft hairs.

== Conservation ==
In 2021, the IUCN assessed Hyperbaena winzerlingii as of Least Concern. The population is large and stable. The species is present in the Sian Kaʼan Biosphere Reserve, the Calakmul Biosphere Reserve, and the Ría Lagartos Biosphere Reserve.

== Nomenclature ==
"Knock me down" is a common English name for Hyperbaena winzerlingii. In Spanish, it is commonly known as Naranjillo.
