= Hyperbaena ilicifolia =

Scientific classification
- Kingdom: Plantae
- Clade: Tracheophytes
- Clade: Angiosperms
- Clade: Eudicots
- Order: Ranunculales
- Family: Menispermaceae
- Genus: Hyperbaena
- Species: H. ilicifolia

Binomial name
- Hyperbaena ilicifolia Standl.

Species of flowering plant

Hyperbaena ilicifolia is a species of flowering plant in the family Menispermaceae. It is a shrub or tree with leathery leaves, greenish-white or yellow flowers, and green or orange fruits. The species is native to southwest Mexico, and was described in 1924.

== Taxonomy ==
The species was described by Paul Carpenter Standley in 1924.

== Distribution ==
Hyperbaena ilicifolia is native to the seasonally dry tropical biome of southwest Mexico. It grows in tropical deciduous forests and on beaches, at elevations of up to 500 metres (1,600 ft).

== Description ==
Hyperbaena ilicifolia is a shrub or tree that grows up to 10 metres (33 ft) high. The trunk is up to 15 centimetres (5.9 in) wide. The branches are subcylindrical and greyish.

The leaves are stiff, leathery, ovate, 1.7–20 centimetres (0.67–7.87 in) long, 1.2–16.5 centimetres (0.47–6.50 in) wide, and have spiny or toothed edges. The stem is 0.5–4 centimetres (0.20–1.57 in) long.

The male inflorescence is a spike or raceme, and usually clustered. It grows on a stem that is up to 1 centimetre (0.39 in) long. The flower stems are up to 1 millimetre (0.039 in) long. The male flowers are greenish-white or yellow, and have six sepals. The outer sepals are obovate-elliptic, around 2 millimetres (0.079 in) long, and around 0.8 millimetres (0.031 in) wide. The inner sepals are broadly obovate, around 2 millimetres (0.079 in) long, and around 1.3 millimetres (0.051 in) wide. The male flowers have zero, three, or six petals, which are obovate-oblong, around 0.6 millimetres (0.024 in) long, and around 0.2 millimetres (0.0079 in) wide. The male flowers have six stamens.

The female inflorescences are usually clustered spikes, which grow on 2–7 millimetres (0.079–0.276 in) stems. The flower stems are up to 1 millimetre (0.039 in) long. The female flowers are greenish-white or yellow, and have six sepals. The outer sepals are oblong, around 1.8 millimetres (0.071 in) long, and around 0.9 millimetres (0.035 in) wide. The inner sepals are ovate-orbicular, around 2.2 millimetres (0.087 in) long, and around 1 millimetre (0.039 in) wide. The female flowers have six petals, which are oblong, around 0.5 millimetres (0.020 in) long, and around 0.2 millimetres (0.0079 in) wide.The female flowers have three or four carpels.

Fruits

The fruits are green to orange, obovoid-orbicular, 16–20 millimetres (0.63–0.79 in) wide and 16–18 millimetres (0.63–0.71 in) wide.
