= Hyperbaena allenii =

Conservation status
- Vulnerable (IUCN 2.3)

Scientific classification
- Kingdom: Plantae
- Clade: Embryophytes
- Clade: Tracheophytes
- Clade: Spermatophytes
- Clade: Angiosperms
- Clade: Eudicots
- Order: Ranunculales
- Family: Menispermaceae
- Genus: Hyperbaena
- Species: H. allenii

Binomial name
- Hyperbaena allenii Standl.

Species of flowering plant

Hyperbaena allenii is a species of plant in the family Menispermaceae. It is found in Costa Rica and Panama. It is threatened by habitat loss.

== Description ==
Hyperbaena allenii is a slender tree up to 15 metres (49 ft). The branches are cylindrical and greyish. The leaves are leathery, oblong-lanceolate, 11–26 centimetres (4.3–10.2 in) long, and 3.5–7.5 centimetres (1.4–3.0 in) long. The leaf edges are smooth, and the leaf stalk is 1.5–2.5 centimetres (0.59–0.98 in) long.

The male inflorescences are solitary or in clusters, and grow on 2–4 millimetres (0.079–0.157 in) stalks. The male flowers have stalks up to 0.5 millimetres (0.020 in) long. The male flowers are greenish, and have six sepals, arranged into two groups. The outer sepals are around 1 millimetre (0.039 in) long, and around 0.3 millimetres (0.012 in) wide. The inner sepals are around 1.5 millimetres (0.059 in) long, and 1 millimetre (0.039 in) wide. The male flowers have six petals, arranged into two groups. The petals are around 0.7 millimetres (0.028 in) long, and 0.5 millimetres (0.020 in) wide. The male flowers have six stamens.

The female inflorescences are solitary or in clusters, and grw on 2–5 millimetres (0.079–0.197 in) long stems.

The fruits are round, 17–20 millimetres (0.67–0.79 in) long, and 14–16 millimetres (0.55–0.63 in) wide.
