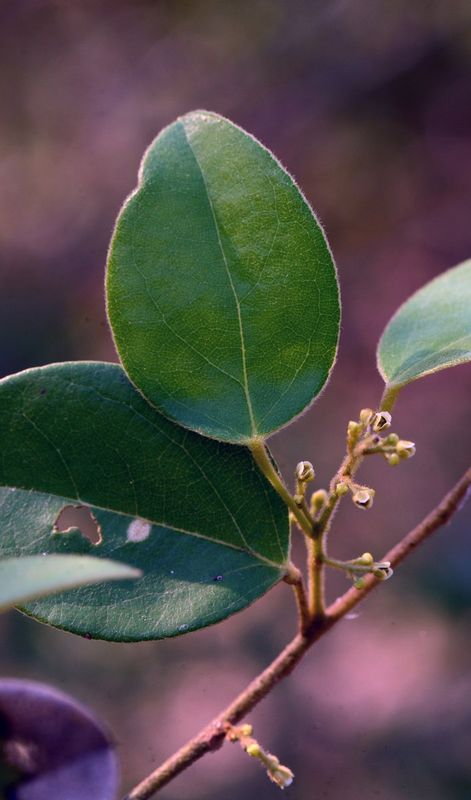

Scientific classification
- Kingdom: Plantae
- Clade: Embryophytes
- Clade: Tracheophytes
- Clade: Angiosperms
- Clade: Eudicots
- Order: Ranunculales
- Family: Menispermaceae
- Genus: Hyperbaena
- Species: H. hassleri

Binomial name
- Hyperbaena hassleri Diels

Synonyms
- Abuta parvifolia Rusby ex Moldenke

= Hyperbaena hassleri =

Species of flowering plant

Hyperbaena hassleri is a species of flowering plant in the family Menispermaceae. It is a climbing plant with leathery leaves, greenish-yellow male flowers, and obovoid fruits. The species is native to Argentina, Bolivia, Brazil, and Paraguay.

Hyperbaena hassleri was described in 1910.

== Taxonomy ==
The species was described by Ludwig Diels in 1910.

== Distribution ==
Hyperbaena hassleri is native to the seasonally dry tropical biome of north-east Argentina, Bolivia, south-east and west-central Brazil, and Paraguay. It grows in woodlands.

== Description ==
Hyperbaena hassleri is a slender climbing plant that grows up to 20 metres (66 ft) long. The branches are cylindrical.

The leaves are leathery, ovate to broadly obovate, 3–9.5 centimetres (1.2–3.7 in) long, and 1.5–6 centimetres (0.59–2.36 in) wide. The margins are smooth, or rarely undulating. The leaf stems are 0.5–2 centimetres (0.20–0.79 in) long.

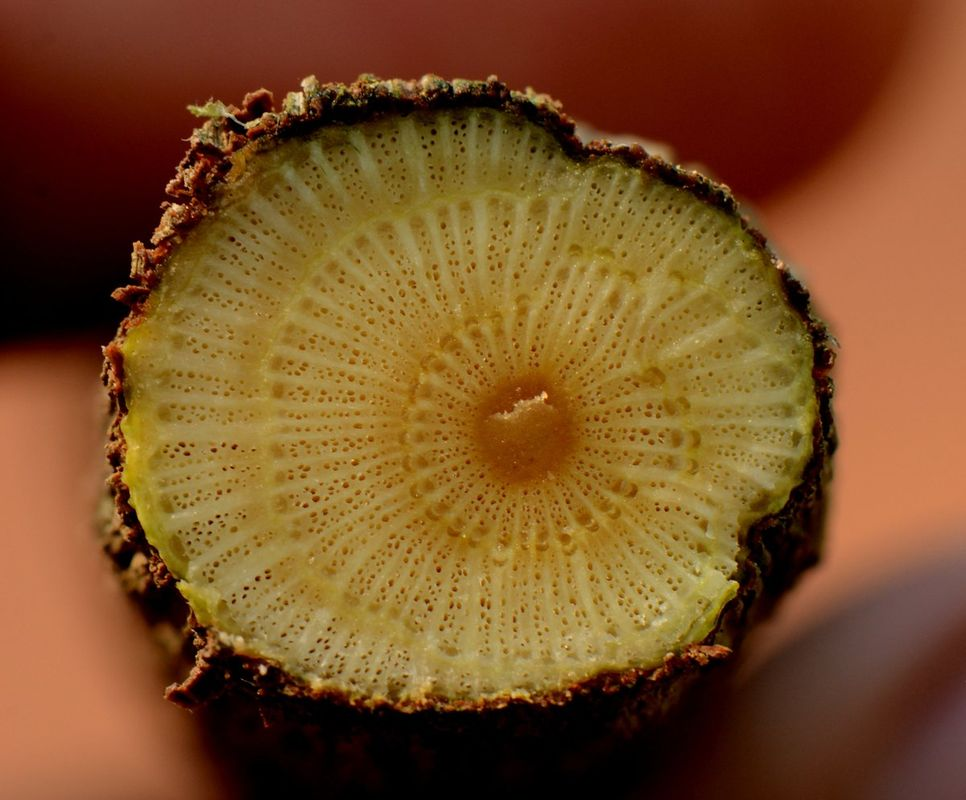
Cross-section of stem

The male inflorescence is a solitary or clustered panicle that grows on a 0.2–1 centimetre (0.079–0.394 in) stem. The stems of male flowers are 1–2.5 millimetres (0.039–0.098 in) long. The male flowers are yellowish-green, and have six sepals in two groups. The outer sepals are narrowly ovate-lanceolate, around 1.3 millimetres (0.051 in) long, and around 0.7 millimetres (0.028 in) wide. The inner sepals are broadly ovate to elliptical, around 2 millimetres (0.079 in) long, and around 6 millimetres (0.24 in) wide. The male flowers have six obovate petals in two groups. The petals are around 1.2 millimetres (0.047 in) long, and around 0.7 millimetres (0.028 in) wide.

The female inflorescence is a slender raceme.

The fruit is obovoid, 10–15 millimetres (0.39–0.59 in) long, and 7–8 millimetres (0.28–0.31 in) wide.
