= Hyperbaena leptobotryosa =

Conservation status
- Least Concern (IUCN 3.1)

Scientific classification
- Kingdom: Plantae
- Clade: Tracheophytes
- Clade: Angiosperms
- Clade: Eudicots
- Order: Ranunculales
- Family: Menispermaceae
- Genus: Hyperbaena
- Species: H. leptobotryosa

Binomial name
- Hyperbaena leptobotryosa (Donn.Sm.) Standl.

Synonyms
- Phyllanthus leptobotryosus Donn.Sm.; Hyperbaena isophylla Standl.

Species of flowering plant

Hyperbaena leptobotryosa is a species of flowering plant in the family Menispermaceae. It is a liana or tree with leathery leaves and yellowish flowers. The species is native to Central America, and was described in 1912.

Hyperbaena leptobotryosa is listed as of Least Concern by the IUCN.

== Taxonomy ==
The species was described by John Donnell Smith in 1912, and placed in the genus Phyllanthus. In 1937, Paul Carpenter Standley transferred it to the genus Hyperbaena.

== Distribution ==
Hyperbaena leptobotryosa is native to the wet tropical biome of Costa Rica, El Salvador, Nicaragua, and Panama. Its estimated extent of occurrence is around 93,873.98 square kilometres (36,244.95 sq mi).

Hyperbaena leptobotryosa grows in wet forests, at elevations of up to 1,300 metres (4,300 ft).

== Description ==
Hyperbaena leptobotryosa is a liana or tree with greyish, cylindrical branches.

The leaves are leathery, ovate-lanceolate, 7–20 centimetres (2.8–7.9 in) long, 3–7 centimetres (1.2–2.8 in) wide, and have smooth, slightly undulating edges. The leaf stems are 1–2 centimetres (0.39–0.79 in) long.

The male inflorescences are usually clustered panicles, and grow on 0.5–4 millimetres (0.020–0.157 in) long stems. The flower stems are 0.5–2 millimetres (0.020–0.079 in) long. The flowers are yellowish, and have six sepals. The outer sepals are narrowly obovate, around 1 millimetre (0.039 in) long, and around 0.6 millimetres (0.024 in) wide. The inner sepals are obovate, around 1.2 millimetres (0.047 in) long, and around 0.8 millimetres (0.031 in) wide. The male flowers have six petals, which are obovate, around 0.9 millimetres (0.035 in) long, and around 0.5 millimetres (0.020 in) wide. The male flowers have six stamens.

The female inflorescences are solitary racemes that grow on 2–3 centimetres (0.79–1.18 in) long stems. The flower stems are 1.4–1.6 centimetres (0.55–0.63 in) long.

The fruit is smooth, ovate, 1.8–2 centimetres (0.71–0.79 in) long, and around 1.5 centimetres (0.59 in) wide.

== Conservation ==
In 2019, the IUCN assessed Hyperbaena leptobotryosa as of Least Concern. The population is large, and faces no major threats.
