= Hyperbaena vulcania =

Scientific classification
- Kingdom: Plantae
- Clade: Tracheophytes
- Clade: Angiosperms
- Clade: Eudicots
- Order: Ranunculales
- Family: Menispermaceae
- Genus: Hyperbaena
- Species: H. vulcania

Binomial name
- Hyperbaena vulcania Standl. & Steyerm.

Species of flowering plant

Hyperbaena vulcania is a species of flowering plant in the family Menispermaceae. It is native to Guatemala, and was described in 1943.

== Taxonomy ==
The species was described by Paul Carpenter Standley and Julian Alfred Steyermark in 1943.

== Distribution ==
Hyperbaena vulcania is native to the wet tropical biome of Guatemala.
