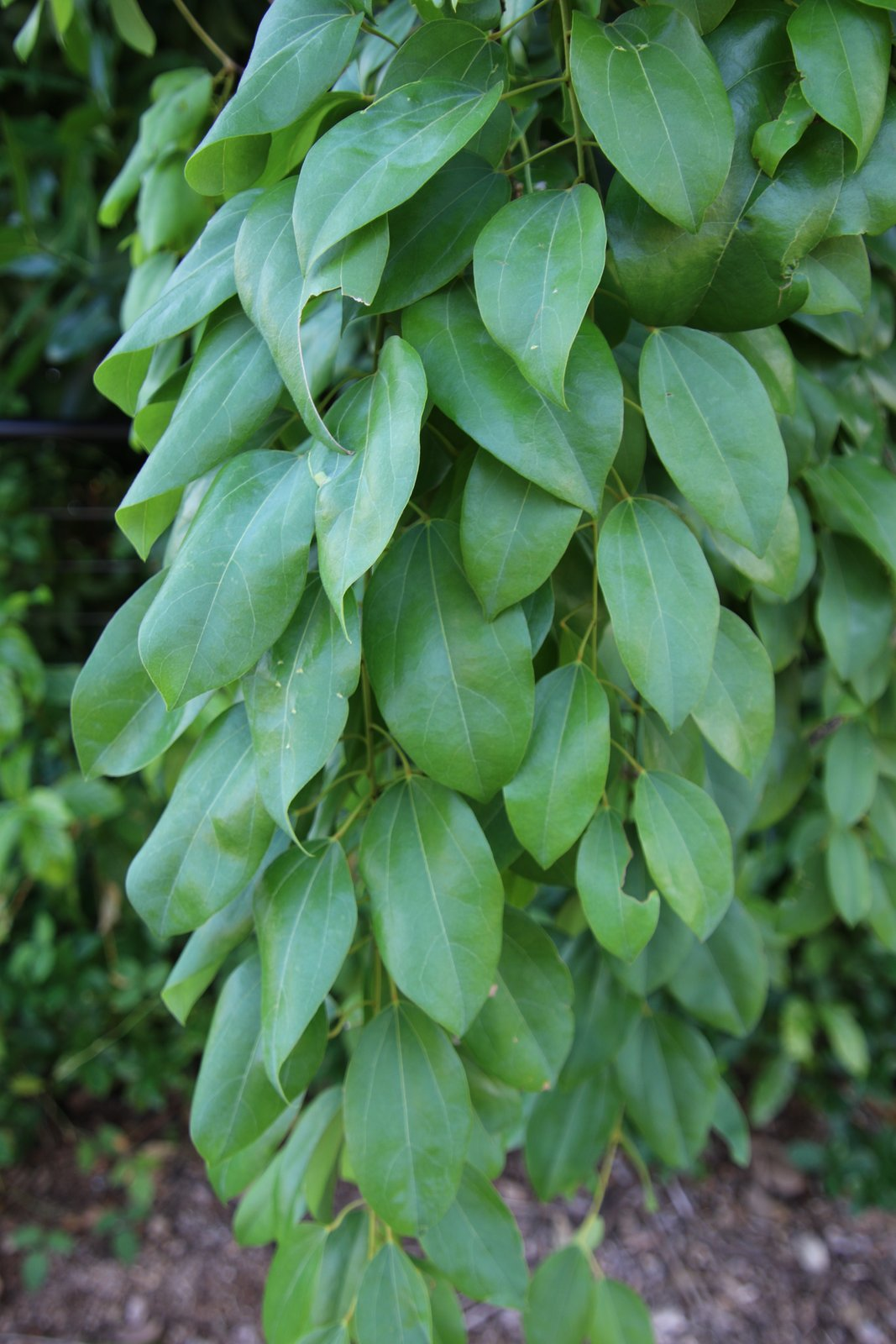
- Darwin, Australia

Scientific classification
- Kingdom: Plantae
- Clade: Tracheophytes
- Clade: Angiosperms
- Clade: Eudicots
- Order: Ranunculales
- Family: Menispermaceae
- Genus: Pachygone
- Species: P. ovata

Binomial name
- Pachygone ovata (Poir.) Miers ex Hook.f. & Thomson

Synonyms
- Cissampelos ovata Poir. (1804); Pachygone pubescens Benth. (30 May 1863); Tristichocalyx pubescens (Benth.) F.Muell. (1863); Cebatha pubescens (Benth.) Kuntze (5 November 1891); Tinospora hullsii F.Muell. (1866); Pachygone hullsii (F.Muell.) F.Muell. (1875)

= Pachygone ovata =

Fish berry

Species of flowering plant

Pachygone ovata, the fish berry, is a climbing plant from northern Australia. The fruit has been used in folk medicine and for fish poison.
