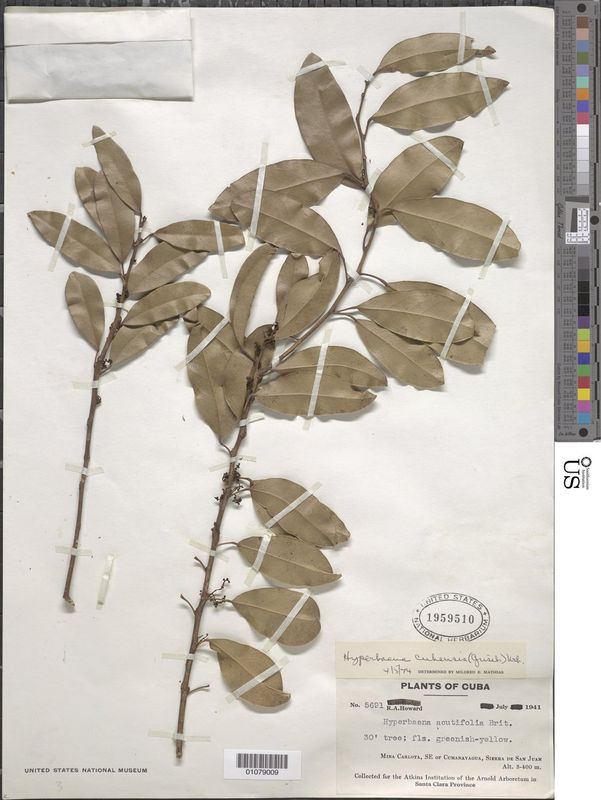

Scientific classification
- Kingdom: Plantae
- Clade: Embryophytes
- Clade: Tracheophytes
- Clade: Spermatophytes
- Clade: Angiosperms
- Clade: Eudicots
- Order: Ranunculales
- Family: Menispermaceae
- Genus: Hyperbaena
- Species: H. cubensis

Binomial name
- Hyperbaena cubensis (Griseb.) Urb.

Varieties
- Hyperbaena cubensis var. cubensis; Hyperbaena cubensis var. parvifolia Kitan.

Synonyms
- Hyperbaena cuneifolia Miers; Pachygone cubensis Griseb.

= Hyperbaena cubensis =

Species of flowering plant

Hyperbaena cubensis is a species of flowering plant in the family Menispermaceae. It is a shrub or tree with leathery leaves, greenish-yellow flowers, and round, black fruits. The species is native to Cuba, and was described in 1866.

== Taxonomy ==
In 1866, August Grisebach named Pachygone cubensis, a synonym of Hyperbaena cubensis. In 1899, Ignatz Urban moved the species from Pachygone to Hyperbaena.

Two varieties are recognised:

- Hyperbaena cubensis var. cubensis
- Hyperbaena cubensis var. parvifolia Kitan.

== Distribution ==
Hyperbaena cubensis is native to the wet tropical biome of Cuba. It grows on limestone, in coastal thickets and dry hills.

== Description ==
Hyperbaena cubensis is a shrub or small tree that grows up to 10 metres (33 ft) high. The branches are grey and cylindrical.

The leaves are leathery, 3–8 centimetres (1.2–3.1 in) long, and 1.5–5.5 centimetres (0.59–2.17 in) wide. The leaf edges are smooth, and usually undulating. The leaf stems are 0.5–1.5 centimetres (0.20–0.59 in) long.

The male inflorescences are usually in clusters, and grow on 0–7 millimetres (0.00–0.28 in) long stems. The male flowers are greenish-yellow, and have six sepals in two groups. The outer sepals are ovate, around 1.5 millimetres (0.059 in) long, and around 1 millimetre (0.039 in) wide. The inner sepals are broadly ovate, around 1.8 millimetres (0.071 in) long, and around 1.3 millimetres (0.051 in) wide. The male flowers have six petals in two groups. The petals are obovate, around 0.5 millimetres (0.020 in) long, and around 0.3 millimetres (0.012 in) wide. The male flowers have six stamens.

The female inflorescences are usually solitary, and grow on 0–11 millimetres (0.00–0.43 in) stems. The flower stems are 0–2 millimetres (0.000–0.079 in) long. The female flowers are greenish-yellow, and have six sepals in two groups. The outer sepals are ovate, around 1.2 millimetres (0.047 in) long, and around 0–8 millimetres (0.00–0.31 in) wide. The inner sepals are broadly ovate, around 1.5 millimetres (0.059 in) long, and around 1.2 millimetres (0.047 in) wide. The female flowers have six petals in two groups. The petals are obovate, around 0.8 millimetres (0.031 in) long, and around 0.5 millimetres (0.020 in) wide. The female flowers have three or four carpels.

The fruit is round, black, 12–14 millimetres (0.47–0.55 in) long, and 12–14 millimetres (0.47–0.55 in) wide.
