= Hyperbaena jalcomulcensis =

Conservation status
- Vulnerable (IUCN 2.3)

Scientific classification
- Kingdom: Plantae
- Clade: Tracheophytes
- Clade: Angiosperms
- Clade: Eudicots
- Order: Ranunculales
- Family: Menispermaceae
- Genus: Hyperbaena
- Species: H. jalcomulcensis

Binomial name
- Hyperbaena jalcomulcensis E. Pérez & Cast.-Campos

Species of flowering plant

Hyperbaena jalcomulcensis is a species of plant in the family Menispermaceae. It is endemic to Mexico. It is threatened by habitat loss.
