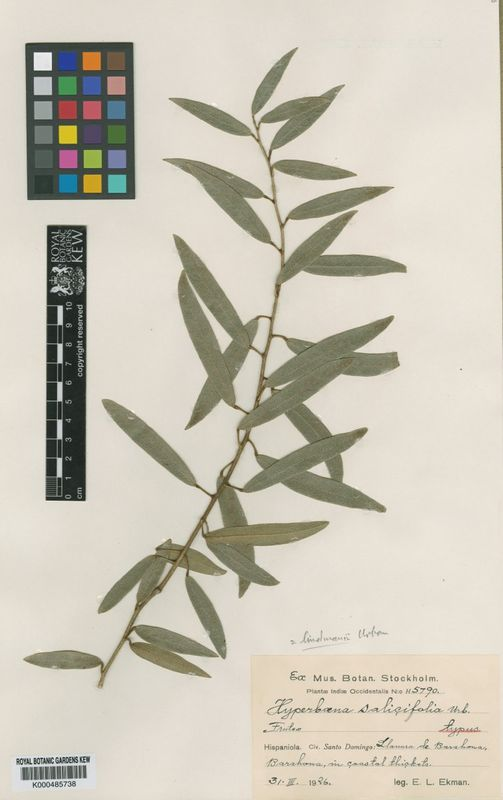

Conservation status
- Vulnerable (IUCN 3.1)

Scientific classification
- Kingdom: Plantae
- Clade: Embryophytes
- Clade: Tracheophytes
- Clade: Spermatophytes
- Clade: Angiosperms
- Clade: Eudicots
- Order: Ranunculales
- Family: Menispermaceae
- Genus: Hyperbaena
- Species: H. lindmanii

Binomial name
- Hyperbaena lindmanii Urb.

Synonyms
- Hyperbaena gonavensis Urb. & Ekman; Hyperbaena salicifolia Urb. & Ekman

= Hyperbaena lindmanii =

Species of flowering plant

Hyperbaena lindmanii (French: Bois de Coq) is a species of flowering plant in the family Menispermaceae. It is a tree with dense wood, leathery leaves, and green fruits. The species is endemic to southern Hispaniola.

Hyperbaena lindmanii was described in 1921, and is listed as Vulnerable by the IUCN.

== Taxonomy ==
The species was described in 1921, by Ignatz Urban.

== Distribution ==
Hyperbaena lindmanii is endemic to the wet tropical biome of southern Hispaniola (the Dominican Republic and Haiti). The species is present on Gonâve Island. Its extent of occurrence is estimated at less than 17,000 square kilometres (6,600 sq mi).

Hyperbaena lindmanii grows in subtropical moist forests and coastal thickets, at elevations of up to 720 metres (2,360 ft). It grows on limestone hills.

== Description ==
Hyperbaena lindmanii is a tree that grows up to 4 metres (13 ft) high. The wood is relatively dense. The branches are cylindrical.

The leaves are leathery, oblong to narrowly ovate, 4–18 centimetres (1.6–7.1 in) long, and 0.7–5 centimetres (0.28–1.97 in) wide. The leaf edges are smooth. The leaf stems are 0.5–2.5 centimetres (0.20–0.98 in) long.

The male inflorescences are spikes, arranged solitary or in clusters. The stems are 0.5–1.5 centimetres (0.20–0.59 in) long. The flowers have six sepals, arranged in two groups. The outer sepals are obovate, around 1 millimetre (0.039 in) long, and around 0.7 millimetres (0.028 in) wide. The inner sepals are broadly ovate, around 1.2 millimetres (0.047 in) long, and around 1 millimetre (0.039 in) wide. The male flowers have six stamens.

The female inflorescences are spikes, and usually solitary. The stems are 0.4–2.3 centimetres (0.16–0.91 in) long.

The fruits are green, 10–17 millimetres (0.39–0.67 in) long and wide, and oughtly spherical.

== Uses ==
The wood of Hyperbaena lindmanii is used for cooking fuels and charcoal.

== Conservation ==
In 2023, the IUCN assessed Hyperbaena lindmanii as Vulnerable. In the Dominican Republic, the species is considered Critically Endangered, though it is more common in Haiti. The population is thought to be declining. Hyperbaena lindmanii is threatened by habitat loss, invasive species, climate change, and the use of its wood as fuel.
