= Hyperbaena tonduzii =

Conservation status
- Least Concern (IUCN 3.1)

Scientific classification
- Kingdom: Plantae
- Clade: Tracheophytes
- Clade: Angiosperms
- Clade: Eudicots
- Order: Ranunculales
- Family: Menispermaceae
- Genus: Hyperbaena
- Species: H. tonduzii

Binomial name
- Hyperbaena tonduzii Diels

Synonyms
- Hyperbaena salvadorensis Steyerm.

Species of flowering plant

Hyperbaena tonduzii is a species of flowering plant in the family Menispermaceae. It is a shrub or tree with leathery leaves, racemose female inflorescences, and yellow fruits. The species is native to Central America, and was described in 1910.

Hyperbaena tonduzii is listed as of Least Concern by the IUCN.

== Taxonomy ==
The species was described by Ludwig Diels in 1910.

== Distribution ==
Hyperbaena tonduzii is native to the wet tropical biome of Costa Rica, El Salvador, Honduras, Nicaragua, and Panama. The species' extent of occurrence is around 199,523.79 square kilometres (77,036.57 sq mi).

It grows in dry coastal thickets along the Pacific Ocean, at elevations of up to 600 metres (2,000 ft).

== Description ==
Hyperbaena tonduzii is a large shrub or tree that grows up to 10 metres (33 ft) high. The crown is dense, and the trunk is up to 40 centimetres (16 in) wide. The older branches are grey, and the younger branches are lighter.

The leaves are ovate, leathery, 8.5–20 centimetres (3.3–7.9 in) long, and 5–10 centimetres (2.0–3.9 in) wide. The edges are smooth and slightly undulating, and the leaf stems are 3.5–7.5 centimetres (1.4–3.0 in) long. The leaves are yellow-green when dry.

The female inflorescences are usually clustered racemes. The female flowers grow on 0.6–2.7 millimetres (0.024–0.106 in) long stems.

The fruits are hanging, yellow, obovoid-orbicular, 2.8–4.2 centimetres (1.1–1.7 in) long, and 2.3–3.5 centimetres (0.91–1.38 in) wide.

== Conservation ==
In 2019, the IUCN assessed Hyperbaena tonduzii as of Least Concern. The population is large, and faces no major threats.
