= Le Mourillon =

Neighborhood of Toulon, France

Coordinates: 43°06′25″N 5°55′55″E

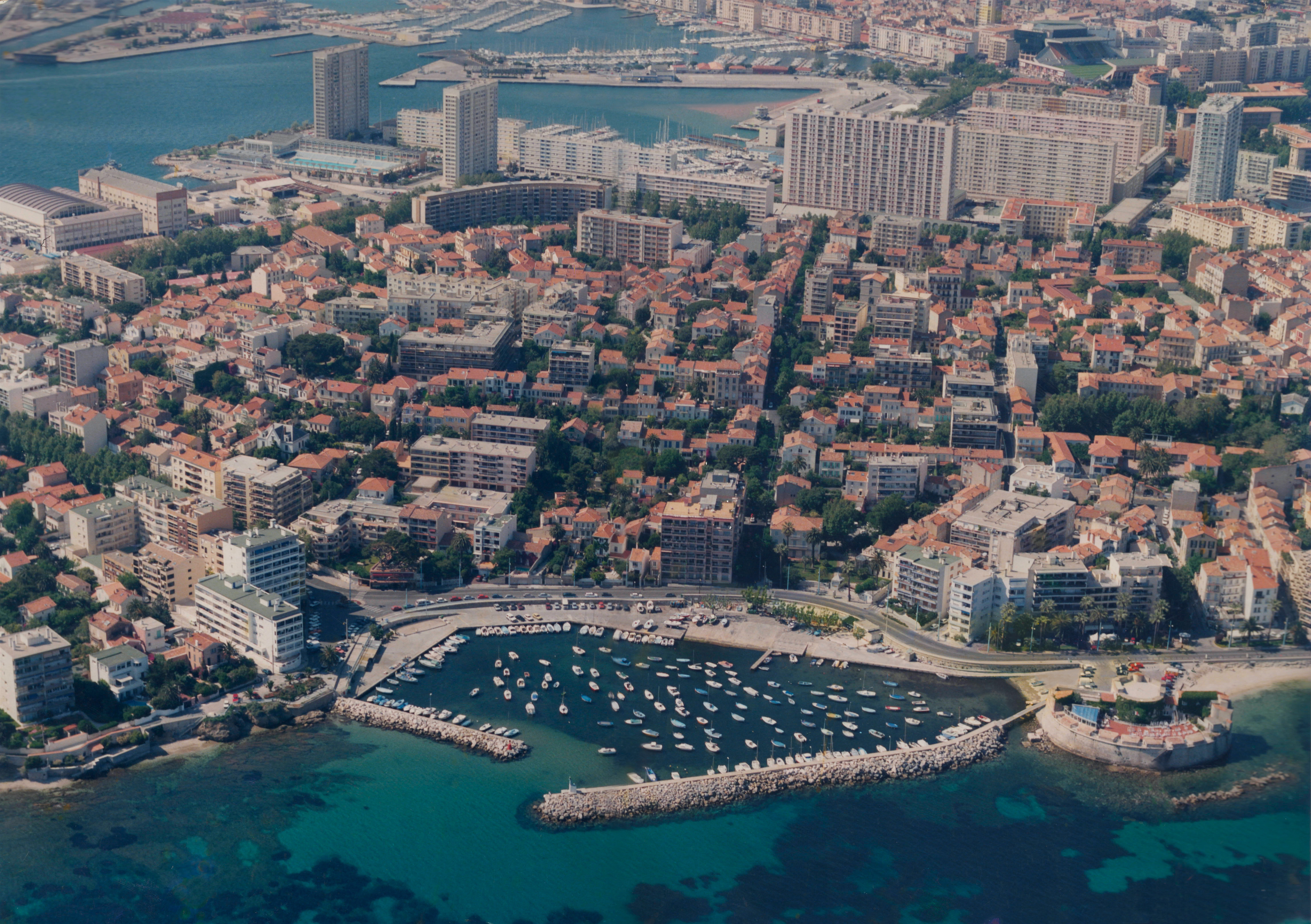
Aerial view of Le Mourillon in 1995

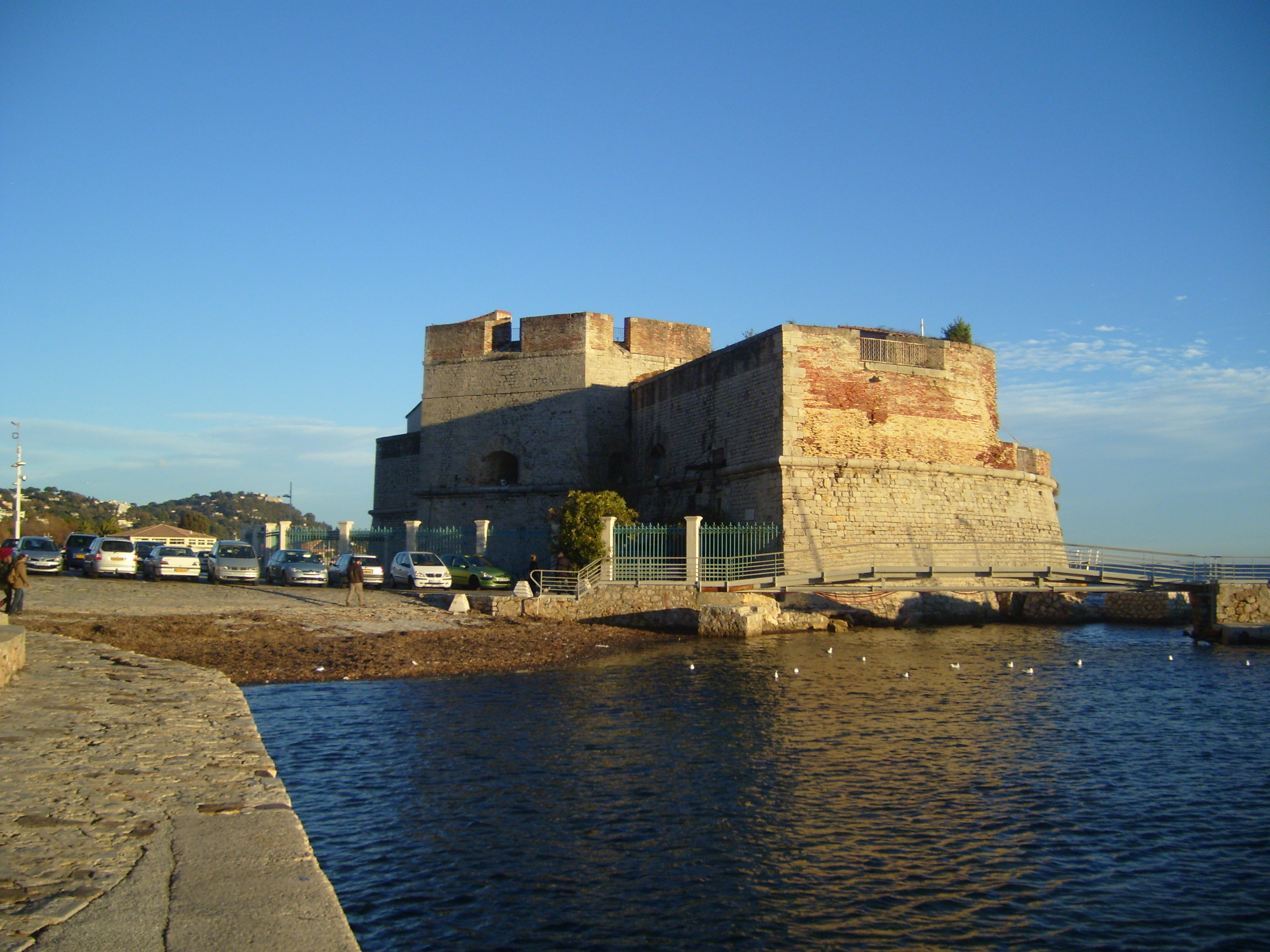
Fort St Louis at Le Mourillon

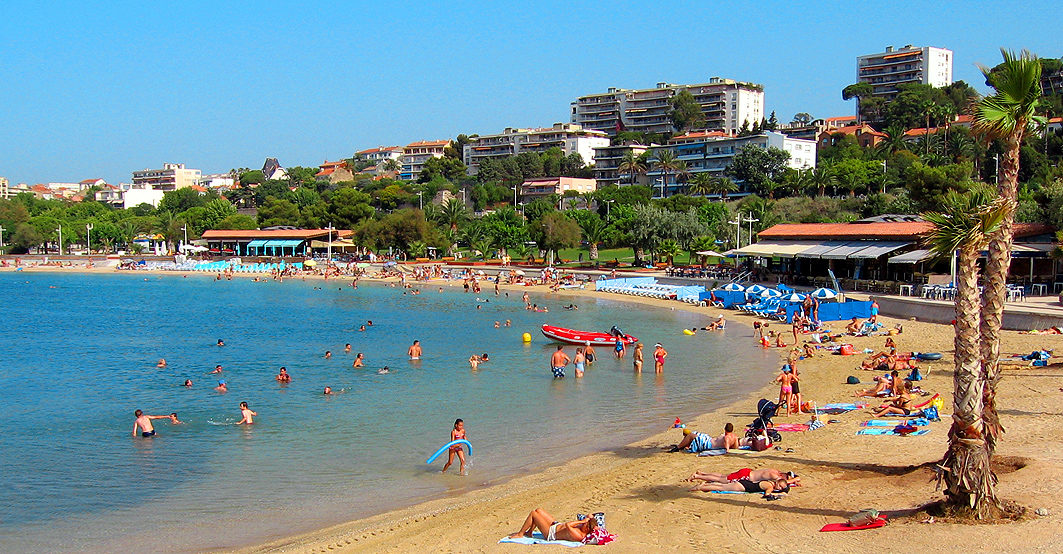
Plage du Mourillon

Le Mourillon is a neighbourhood to the east of the French city of Toulon, near the entrance to the Rade or roadstead. It was once a fishing village, and then became the home of many of the officers of the French fleet and to part of the naval dockyard. Mourillon has a small fishing port, next to a 16th-century fort, Fort Saint Louis, which was reconstructed by Vauban. In the 1970s the city of Toulon built a series of sheltered sandy beaches in Mourillon, which today are very popular with the Toulonais and with naval families. The Museum of Asian Art is located in a house on the waterfront near Fort St. Louis.

== Points of interest ==
- Beaches of Mourillon (Plages du Mourillon)
- Fort Saint-Louis
- Jardin d'acclimatation du Mourillon

== Sport ==
- Union sportive du Mourillon club de rugby à XV.
- Cadets 2006/2007 Demi-Finalistes Teulière B
- Cadets 2007/2008 Eliminated in the 16éme of Final Teulière B
