= Hyperbaena smilacina =

Scientific classification
- Kingdom: Plantae
- Clade: Tracheophytes
- Clade: Angiosperms
- Clade: Eudicots
- Order: Ranunculales
- Family: Menispermaceae
- Genus: Hyperbaena
- Species: H. smilacina

Binomial name
- Hyperbaena smilacina Standl.

Species of flowering plant

Hyperbaena smilacina is a species of flowering plant in the family Menispermaceae. It is a vine with subleathery leaves, and is native to Central and South America. The species was described in 1925.

== Taxonomy ==
The species was described by Paul Carpenter Standley in 1925.

== Distribution ==
Hyperbaena smilacina is native to the wet tropical biome of Colombia, Costa Rica, and Nicaragua.

== Description ==
Hyperbaena smilacina is a slender woody vine with cylindrical branches. The leaves are subleathery, ovate or rounded-ovate, 7.5–9 centimetres (3.0–3.5 in) long, and 4.5–7 centimetres (1.8–2.8 in) wide. The leaf stems are 3–4 centimetres (1.2–1.6 in) long.

The male inflorescence is a solitary panicle with many flowers. The sepals and petals are smooth.
