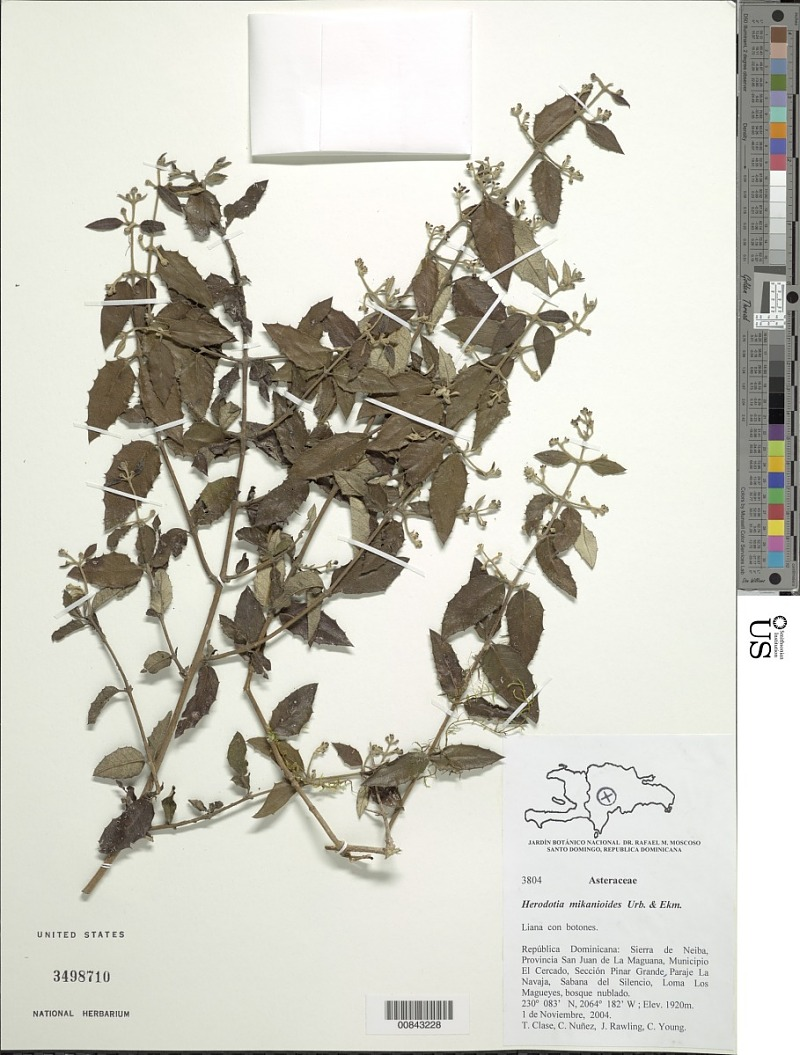

Scientific classification
- Kingdom: Plantae
- Clade: Tracheophytes
- Clade: Angiosperms
- Clade: Eudicots
- Clade: Asterids
- Order: Asterales
- Family: Asteraceae
- Subfamily: Asteroideae
- Tribe: Senecioneae
- Genus: Ekmaniopappus; Borhidi
- Species: E. mikanioides

Binomial name
- Ekmaniopappus mikanioides (Urb. & Ekman) Borhidi

Synonyms
- Herodotia mikanioides Urb. & Ekman

= Ekmaniopappus =

Genus of flowering plants

Ekmaniopappus is a genus of flowering plants in the daisy family.

== Species ==
There is only one known species, Ekmaniopappus mikanioides, native to the island of Hispaniola in the West Indies (Haiti and Dominican Republic).
