= Hyperbaena laurifolia =

Conservation status
- Least Concern (IUCN 3.1)

Scientific classification
- Kingdom: Plantae
- Clade: Tracheophytes
- Clade: Angiosperms
- Clade: Eudicots
- Order: Ranunculales
- Family: Menispermaceae
- Genus: Hyperbaena
- Species: H. laurifolia

Binomial name
- Hyperbaena laurifolia (Poir.) Urb.

Synonyms
- Cissampelos laurifolia Poir.; Cocculus erectus Eggers ex Diels; Hyperbaena apiculata Urb. & Ekman; Hyperbaena glauciramis Urb. & Ekman; Hyperbaena pellucida Urb. & Ekman

Species of flowering plant

Hyperbaena laurifolia, commonly known as limestone snakevine, is a species of flowering plant in the family Menispermaceae. It is a perennial shrub, tree, or vine, with leathery leaves, greenish-yellow flowers, and roughtly spherical fruits. The species is native to Hispaniola, the Leeward Islands, and Puerto Rico.

Hyperbaena laurifolia was described in 1804, and is listed as of Least Concern by the IUCN.

== Taxonomy ==
Hyperbaena laurifolia was described by Jean Louis Marie Poiret in 1804, and placed in the genus Cissampelos. In 1899, Ignatz Urban transferred it to the genus Hyperbaena.

== Distribution ==
Hyperbaena laurifolia is native to the wet tropical biome of the Dominican Republic, Haiti, the Leeward Islands, and Puerto Rico. It grows at elevations of up to 1,200 metres (3,900 ft), in wooded limestone areas.

Its extent of occurrence is around 119,811 metres (393,081 ft).

== Description ==
Hyperbaena laurifolia is a perennial shrub, tree, or vine. It grows up to 6 metres (20 ft) high as a climbing plant, and up to 5 metres (16 ft) high as a tree. The trunk is up to 7.5 centimetres (3.0 in) wide. The branches are cylindrical and striped.

The leaves are leathery, narrowly ovate to obovate, 7–16 centimetres (2.8–6.3 in) long, and 2.5–6 centimetres (0.98–2.36 in) wide. The edges are smooth and undulating. The leaf stems are 1–4 centimetres (0.39–1.57 in) long.

The male inflorescences are usually clustered panicles, which grow on 0.2–1 centimetre (0.079–0.394 in) long stems. The flowers grow on 0.5–1.5 millimetres (0.020–0.059 in) long stems. The flowers are greenish-yellow, and have six sepals. The outer sepals are narrowly obovate to obovate-oblong, around 1.2 millimetres (0.047 in) long, and around 0.7 millimetres (0.028 in) wide. The inner sepals are broadly obovate to orbicular, around 1.6 millimetres (0.063 in) long, and around 1.2 millimetres (0.047 in) wide. The male flowers have six petals, which are obovate, around 0.6 millimetres (0.024 in) long, and around 0.5 millimetres (0.020 in) wide. The male flowers have six stamens.

The female inflorescences are usually clustered racemes, which grow on 0.2–1 centimetre (0.079–0.394 in) long stems. The flowers grow on 1–2.5 millimetres (0.039–0.098 in) long stems. The flowers are greenish-yellow, and have six sepals. The outer sepals are ovate-oblong, around 1.2 millimetres (0.047 in) long, and around 0.8 millimetres (0.031 in) wide. The inner sepals are ovate, around 1.5 millimetres (0.059 in) long, and around 1 millimetre (0.039 in) wide. The female flowers have six petals, which are obovate, around 0.7 millimetres (0.028 in) long, and around 0.5 millimetres (0.020 in) wide. The female flowers have three carpels.

The fruits are roughly spherical.

The fruits are roughly spherical, 2–2.5 centimetres (0.79–0.98 in) long, and 2–2.3 centimetres (0.79–0.91 in) broad.

== Conservation ==
In 2023, the IUCN assessed Hyperbaena laurifolia as of Least Concern. The population is assumed to be stable. The species is present in several protected areas, including the Virgin Islands National Park.

Hyperbaena laurifolia may be threatened by habitat loss.

== Nomenclature ==
Hyperbaena laurifolia is commonly known as "limestone snakevine".
