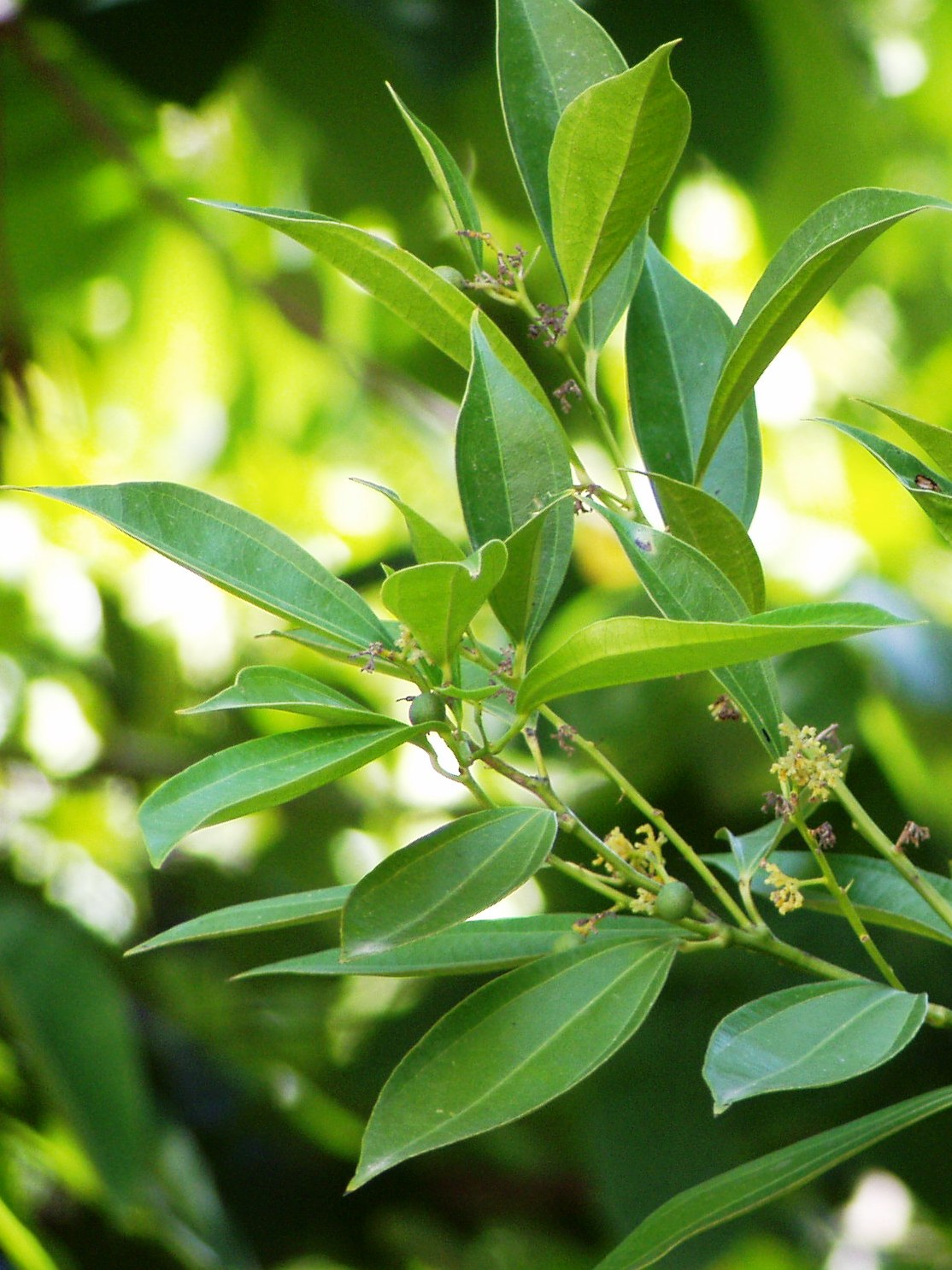

Conservation status
- Least Concern (IUCN 3.1)

Scientific classification
- Kingdom: Plantae
- Clade: Tracheophytes
- Clade: Angiosperms
- Clade: Eudicots
- Order: Ranunculales
- Family: Menispermaceae
- Genus: Pachygone
- Species: P. laurifolia

Binomial name
- Pachygone laurifolia (DC.) L.Lian & Wei Wang

Synonyms
- 13 synonyms: Cebatha laurifolia (DC.) Kuntze; Cinnamomum esquirolii H.Lév.; Cocculus angustifolius Hassk.; Cocculus bariensis Pierre ex Gagnep.; Cocculus laurifolius DC.; Cocculus laurifolius var. angustifolius (Hassk.) Boerl.; Cocculus laurifolius var. triplinervis Boerl.; Galloa trinervis Hassk.; Holopeira australis Miers; Holopeira fusiformis Miers; Holopeira laurifolia (DC.) Miers; Menispermum laurifolium (DC.) Roxb.; Nephroia laurifolia (DC.) Miers

= Pachygone laurifolia =

Laurel-leaved snail tree

Species of flowering plant

Pachygone laurifolia, the laurel-leaved snail tree, is a medium-sized, shrubby evergreen tree of the moonseed family, Menispermaceae. It is native to the foothills of the Himalayas, China, Taiwan, and Japan, where it commonly grows to a height of 2.3 m (7.5 ft), with an equal spread. In cultivation it can reach a similar size where conditions are favorable. Form is round-headed, with a medium to fast growth rate and a coarse texture. Leaves are ovate-lanceolate, about 150 mm (6 in) long by 51 mm (2 in) wide, with a spiral bud arrangement. Leaf color is medium green. This species is dioecious, with male and female flowers on separate plants. Flowers are insignificant: small, yellowish and appearing in spikes at leaf axils. Fruit is a small (6 mm) black drupe. With frequent shearing, plants may work well in a formal setting as a hedge or screen. Will take a wide range of sun and soil conditions within its temperature tolerance.

== Gallery ==
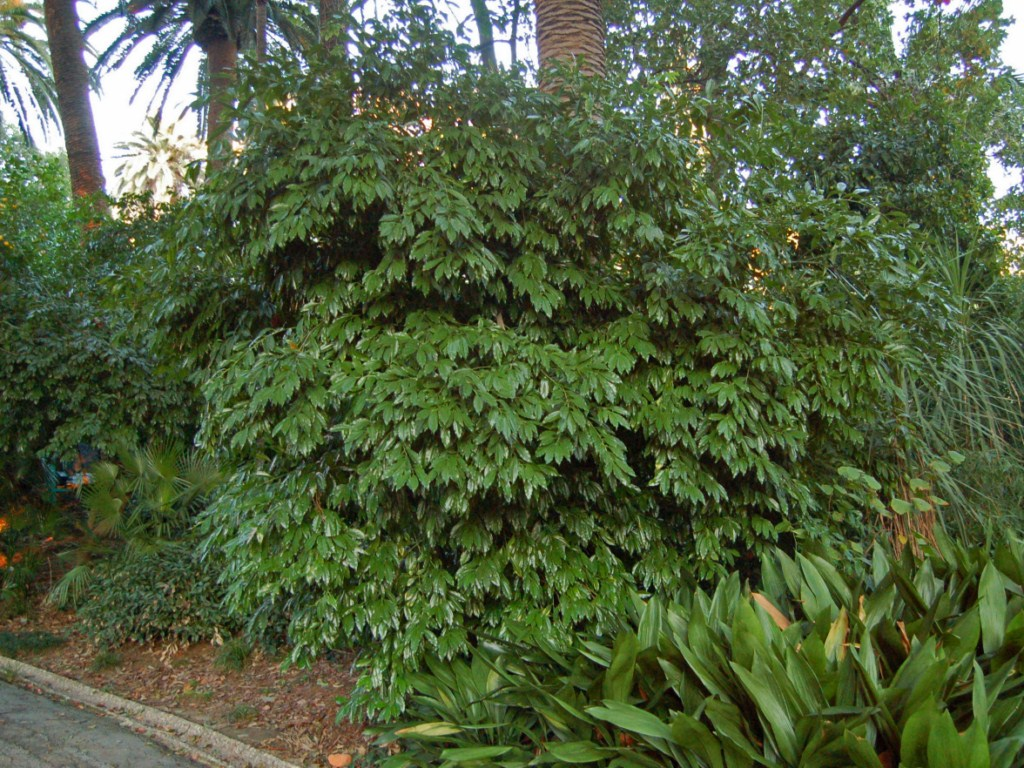
Plant of Pachygone laurifolia

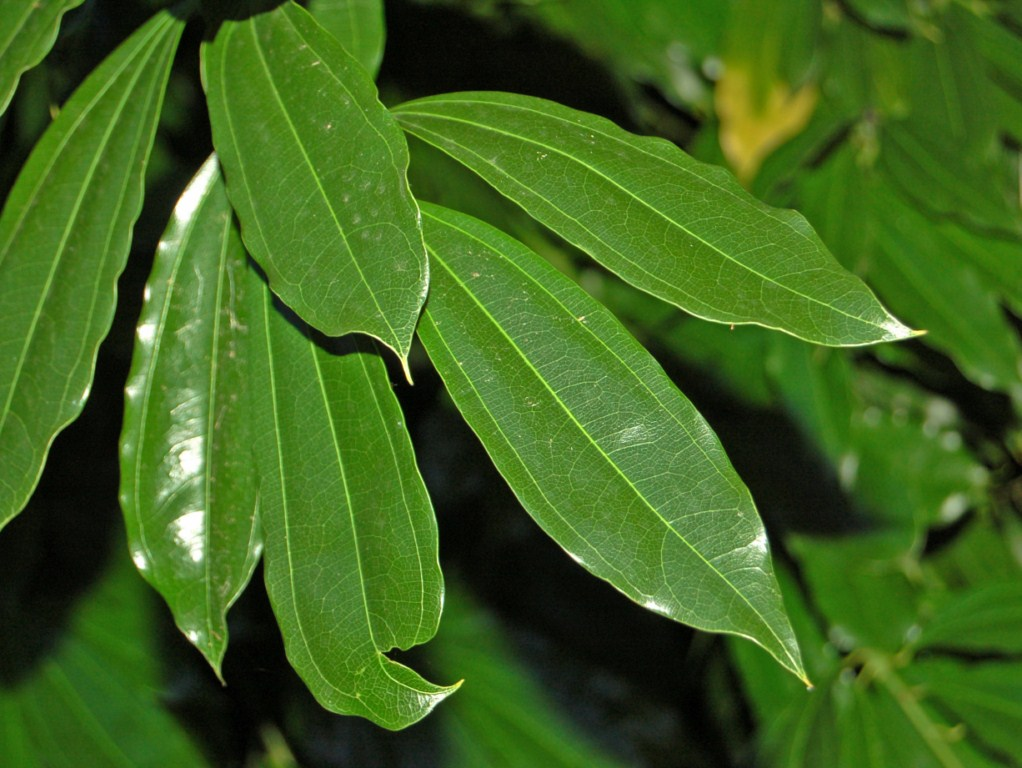
Leaves of Pachygone laurifolia

== Alkaloids ==
Laurifoline

Laurifoline [7224-61-5] is an aporphine alkaloid quat cation that is contained in Cocculus laurifolius.
