= Hyperbaena prioriana =

Conservation status
- Near Threatened (IUCN 2.3)

Scientific classification
- Kingdom: Plantae
- Clade: Tracheophytes
- Clade: Angiosperms
- Clade: Eudicots
- Order: Ranunculales
- Family: Menispermaceae
- Genus: Hyperbaena
- Species: H. prioriana

Binomial name
- Hyperbaena prioriana Miers

Species of flowering plant

Hyperbaena prioriana is a species of flowering plant in the family Menispermaceae. It is sometimes referred to by the common name beef-bone,

== Distribution ==
It is endemic to Jamaica and grows in rocky limestone woodlands in central and western Jamaica at elevations up to 700 metres (2,300 ft).

== Description ==
Hyperbaena prioriana is a shrub or tree that grows up to 15 metres (49 ft) high, and 35 centimetres (14 in) wide. The branches are greyish to brown. The leaves are leathery, ovate, 3–11 centimetres (1.2–4.3 in) long, and 2–7.5 centimetres (0.79–2.95 in) wide. The leaf stems are 1.5–5.5 centimetres (0.59–2.17 in) long. The male inflorescences are usually in clusters, and grow on 0.5–2.2 centimetres (0.20–0.87 in) stems. The male flowers are yellowish-green, and have six sepals, arranged in two groups. The outer sepals are oblong-lanceolate, around 1 millimetre (0.039 in) long, and around 0.2 millimetres (0.0079 in) wide. The inner sepals are broadly ovate to obovate, around 1.5 millimetres (0.059 in), and around 1.1 millimetres (0.043 in) wide. The male flowers have six petals, which are around 0.5 millimetres (0.020 in) long, and 0.3 millimetres (0.012 in) wide. The male flowers have six stamens. The female inflorescences are often in dense clusters, and grow on 0.5–2 centimetres (0.20–0.79 in) long stems. The flower stems are 2–5 millimetres (0.079–0.197 in) long. The fruits are round, green, and 8–12 millimetres (0.31–0.47 in) wide and long.
