= Hyperbaena mexicana =

Conservation status
- Least Concern (IUCN 3.1)

Scientific classification
- Kingdom: Plantae
- Clade: Tracheophytes
- Clade: Angiosperms
- Clade: Eudicots
- Order: Ranunculales
- Family: Menispermaceae
- Genus: Hyperbaena
- Species: H. mexicana

Binomial name
- Hyperbaena mexicana Miers

Synonyms
- Hyperbaena denticulata Standl; Hyperbaena guatemalensis Standl.; Hyperbaena nectandrifolia Standl.; Hyperbaena phanerophlebia Standl.

Species of flowering plant

Hyperbaena mexicana is a species of flowering plant in the family Menispermaceae. It is a shrub or tree with leathery leaves, flowers with six sepals, and yellowish-green to red fruits. The species is native to Central America and Mexico, and was described in 1871.

Hyperbaena mexicana is listed as of Least Concern by the IUCN.

== Taxonomy ==
The name Hyperbaena mexicana was invalidly published as a nomen nudum by John Miers in 1851. Miers described the species validly in 1871.

== Distribution ==
Hyperbaena mexicana is native to the wet tropical biome of Belize, El Salvador, Guatemala, Honduras, and Mexico (Gulf, south-east, and south-west). Within Guatemala, it is found in Petén, Izabal, El Progreso, Santa Rosa, Quetzaltenango, Retalhuleu, and Huehuetenango. It may also be present in Nicaragua.

It grows at elevations of 150–1,400 metres (490–4,590 ft), in deciduous and wet forests.

== Description ==
Hyperbaena mexicana is a shrub or small tree that grows up to 12 metres (39 ft) high, and around 13 centimetres (5.1 in) wide. The branches are cylindrical, and brown or greyish.

The leaves are leathery, ovate to oblong-lanceolate, 7–20 centimetres (2.8–7.9 in) long, and 3–10 centimetres (1.2–3.9 in) wide. The edges are smooth and somewhat undulating. The leaf stem is 1–3 centimetres (0.39–1.18 in) long.

The male inflorescences are usually clustered panicles or racemes, which grow on 0.4–1.8 centimetres (0.16–0.71 in) long stems. The flower stems are 1–5 millimetres (0.039–0.197 in) long. The male flowers have six sepals. The outer sepals are obovate, 1–1.3 millimetres (0.039–0.051 in) long, and around 1 millimetre (0.039 in) wide. The inner sepals are broadly ovate to orbicular, around 1.5 millimetres (0.059 in) long, and 1–1.2 millimetres (0.039–0.047 in) wide. The male flowers have six obovate to rhombic petals, which are 0.7–0.9 millimetres (0.028–0.035 in) long, and 0.5–0.6 millimetres (0.020–0.024 in) wide. The male flowers have six stamens.

Flower

The female inflorescences are usually solitary spikes or racemes, which grow on 0.5–2.3 centimetres (0.20–0.91 in) long stems. The flower stems are up to 8 millimetres (0.31 in) long. The female flowers have six sepals. The outer sepals are ovate, around 1.4 millimetres (0.055 in) long, and around 1 millimetre (0.039 in) wide. The inner sepals are ovate-oblong, around 1.8 millimetres (0.071 in) long, and around 1 millimetre (0.039 in) wide. The female flowers have six petals, which are obovate-oblong, around 1 millimetre (0.039 in) long, and around 0.6 millimetres (0.024 in) wide. The female flowers have three carpels.

The fruits are yellowish-green to red, obovoid or globose, 16–28 millimetres (0.63–1.10 in) long, and 15–24 millimetres (0.59–0.94 in) wide.

== Conservation ==
In 2019, the IUCN assessed Hyperbaena mexicana as of Least Concern. The species faces no major threats.

== Nomenclature ==
In Spanish, the species is known as manguito. In Tzeltal, it is known as coshosté.
