= Hyperbaena valida =

Conservation status
- Near Threatened (IUCN 2.3)

Scientific classification
- Kingdom: Plantae
- Clade: Tracheophytes
- Clade: Angiosperms
- Clade: Eudicots
- Order: Ranunculales
- Family: Menispermaceae
- Genus: Hyperbaena
- Species: H. valida

Binomial name
- Hyperbaena valida Miers

Species of flowering plant

Hyperbaena valida is a species of flowering plants in the family Menispermaceae.

== Distribution ==
It is endemic to Jamaica and grows on limestone in coastal thickets.

== Description ==
Hyperbaena valida is a slender tree up to 6 metres (20 ft) high. The trunk is up to 10 centimetres (3.9 in) wide. The branches are tan to grey. The leaves are leathery, somewhat wavy, ovate, 8–24 centimetres (3.1–9.4 in) long, and 5–10 centimetres (2.0–3.9 in) wide. The leaves have smooth edges. The leaf stems are 1.5–6 centimetres (0.59–2.36 in) long. The male inflorescences are arranged into dense clusters. The female inflorescences grow on the trunk, from 1–3.6 centimetres (0.39–1.42 in) stems. The flower stems are 1–5 millimetres (0.039–0.197 in) long. The female flowers are yellowish-green, and have six sepals arranged in two groups. The outer sepals are ovate, around 1.5 millimetres (0.059 in) long, and around 1.1 millimetres (0.043 in) wide. The inner sepals are broadly ovate to orbicular, around 2.2 millimetres (0.087 in) long, and around 2 millimetres (0.079 in) wide. The female flowers have six obovate-spatulate petals, arranged into two groups. The petals are around 1 millimetre (0.039 in) long, and 0.8 millimetres (0.031 in) wide. The female flowers have three to five carpels. The fruits are round, green, 12–15 millimetres (0.47–0.59 in) long, and 12–15 millimetres (0.47–0.59 in) wide.
