= Erik Leonard Ekman =

Swedish botanist of the 20th century

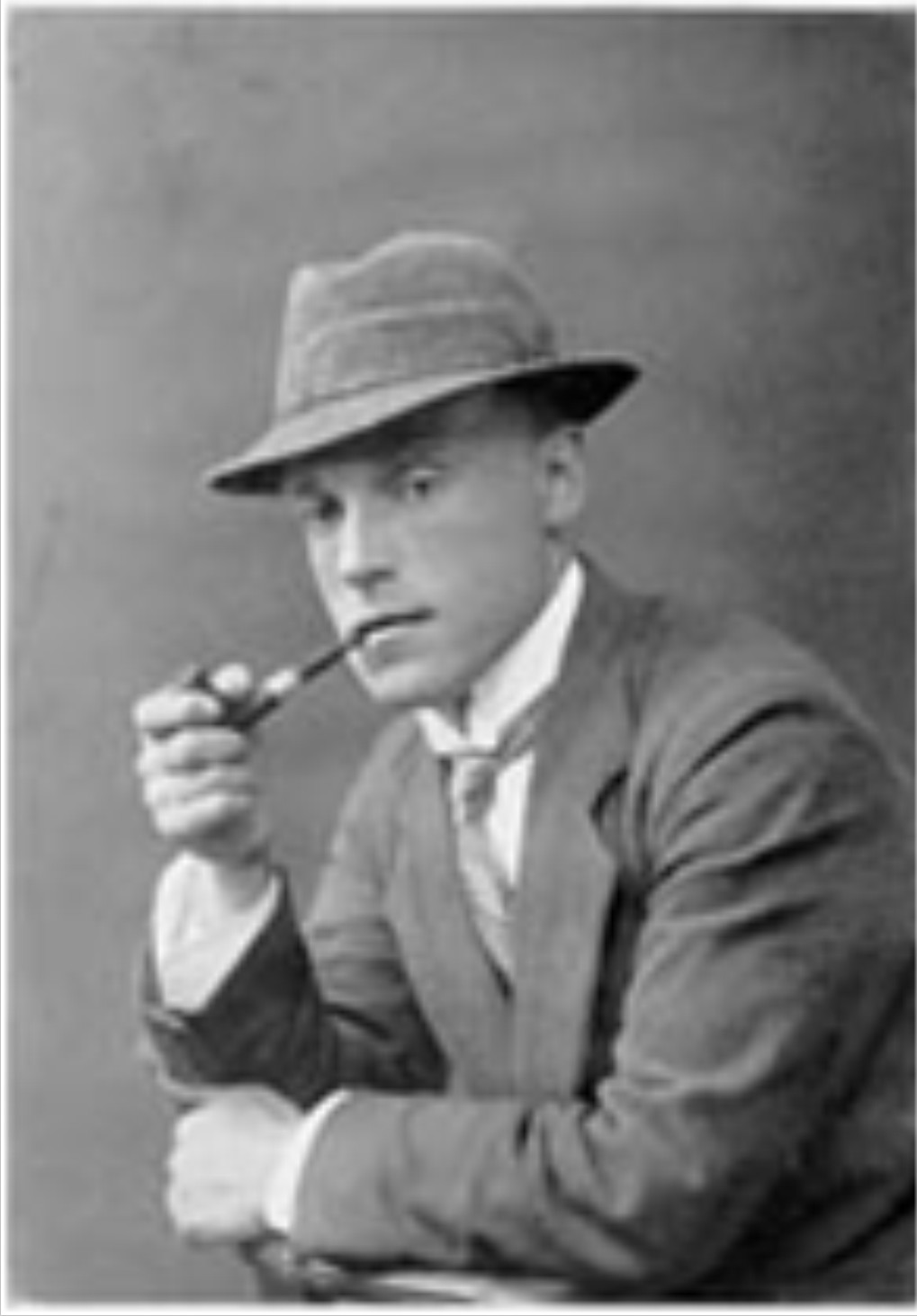
- Born: October 14, 1883; Stockholm, Sweden
- Died: January 15, 1931 (aged 47); Santiago de los Caballeros, Dominican Republic
- Occupation(s): Botanist, explorer, geographer, naturalist
- Years active: 1914–1931
- Known for: Describing several new species of Cuban and Hispaniolan flora/fauna

Erik Leonard Ekman was a Swedish botanist and explorer.

== Biography ==
Erik Leonard Ekman was born on October 14, 1883. Due to economic difficulties, the family moved to the central-Swedish town of Jönköping when he was eleven and a half. Here, while at school, his passion for botanical collecting started. He was awarded a bachelor's degree in 1907 at Lund University in southern Sweden and was offered free passage on a ship to Argentina with a Swedish shipping company. He spent three months in Misiones collecting plants, aided greatly by the local Swedish colony. While there, he was offered a position as the Regnellian amanuensis at the Swedish Museum of Natural History in Stockholm, which he gladly accepted. He started his service at the museum in 1908. Thanks to financial support from the Regnell fund, he was able to travel widely through Europe and study with many of the prominent botanists of the time.

Ekman presented his doctoral dissertation at Lund in 1914. In the same year, he was to participate in the third Regnellian expedition to South America. His goal was Brazil, but Ekman was given an assignment from professors Ignatius Urban (from Berlin) and C. Lindman (from Stockholm) to make short stops on Cuba (one month) and Hispaniola (eight months), to collect specimens for Urban's Symbolae Antillanae botanical project. Ekman agreed to do so, but under protest. His trip to Brazil was further delayed for two years by the onset of World War I, political unrest in Haiti, and a plague epidemic in Cuba.

Ekman landed in Havana in 1914 and, except for a short visit to Haiti during 1917, remained in Cuba for seven years. After serious disagreements with (and pressure from) the Swedish Royal Academy of Science in Stockholm, Ekman returned to the island of Hispaniola in 1924 and is credited with having discovered hundreds of new species during his 7-year stay there. He collected in southwestern Haiti's Massif de la Hotte in and around present-day Pic Macaya National Park from December 1926 to January 1927 with Henry D. Barker, and again in September 1928. He collected in the Massif de la Selle on several occasions in 1917 and in the 1920s. He collected primarily in Haiti from 1924 to 1928 and in the Dominican Republic from 1928 until his death in Santiago de los Caballeros on January 15, 1931, at the age of 46. He died from influenza after having been battered and weakened by pneumonia, bouts of malaria and black water fever. He never returned to Sweden after having left it for the second time.

Ekman was interred in Santiago de los Caballeros, where a plaque was erected in his honor by the Dominican government and the American Society of Plant Taxonomists on October 14, 1950.

== Legacy ==
Ekman contributed to the knowledge of the Caribbean flora more than any other previous scientist. He described more than 2,000 species new to science (a great many of which are now named after him); this was remarkable, since by then the flora of the Caribbean was considered to be extensively documented. His collections are still actively used in the research on the West Indian flora. He collected around 36,000 numbers, amounting with duplicates to more than 150,000 specimens. The Haitian species collected and documented by Ekman were mostly described by Ignatius Urban or by Urban and Ekman. Ekman's published account and unpublished field notes provide detailed descriptions of the flora of the Selle and Hotte massifs as they existed in the 1920s. Ekman also made some geographical discoveries: he mapped several mountains of Haiti and was among the first to measure accurately the highest Dominican (and Caribbean) mountain, Pico Duarte. Ekman also collected birds, mammals and reptiles, of which several species bear his name, e.g. the Hispaniolan nightjar (Antrostomus ekmani). There are also streets in both Santiago and Santo Domingo bearing his name. In Cuba, a special department in the Botanical Garden that is named after Ekman contains plant species related to his work.

The Swedish Foundation Instituto Ekman was established in 1991 in his honour. The aims of the Foundation are to intensify the scientific and cultural exchange between Sweden and the Caribbean countries.

An in depth biographical work on Ekman by Thomas A. Zanoni (New York) and Roger Lundin (Sweden) is ongoing.

The genera Ekmanochloa Hitchc., Ekmania Gleason, Ekmaniocharis Urb., Ekmamnianthe Urb., Myrtekmania Urb., Manekia Trel. Ekmaniopappus Borhidi and Elekmania B.Nord. were named for him.

== Literature ==
B. Nordenstam & K. Oldfeldt Hjertonsson Plantae Ekmanianae Atlantis, Stockholm, 2007.
