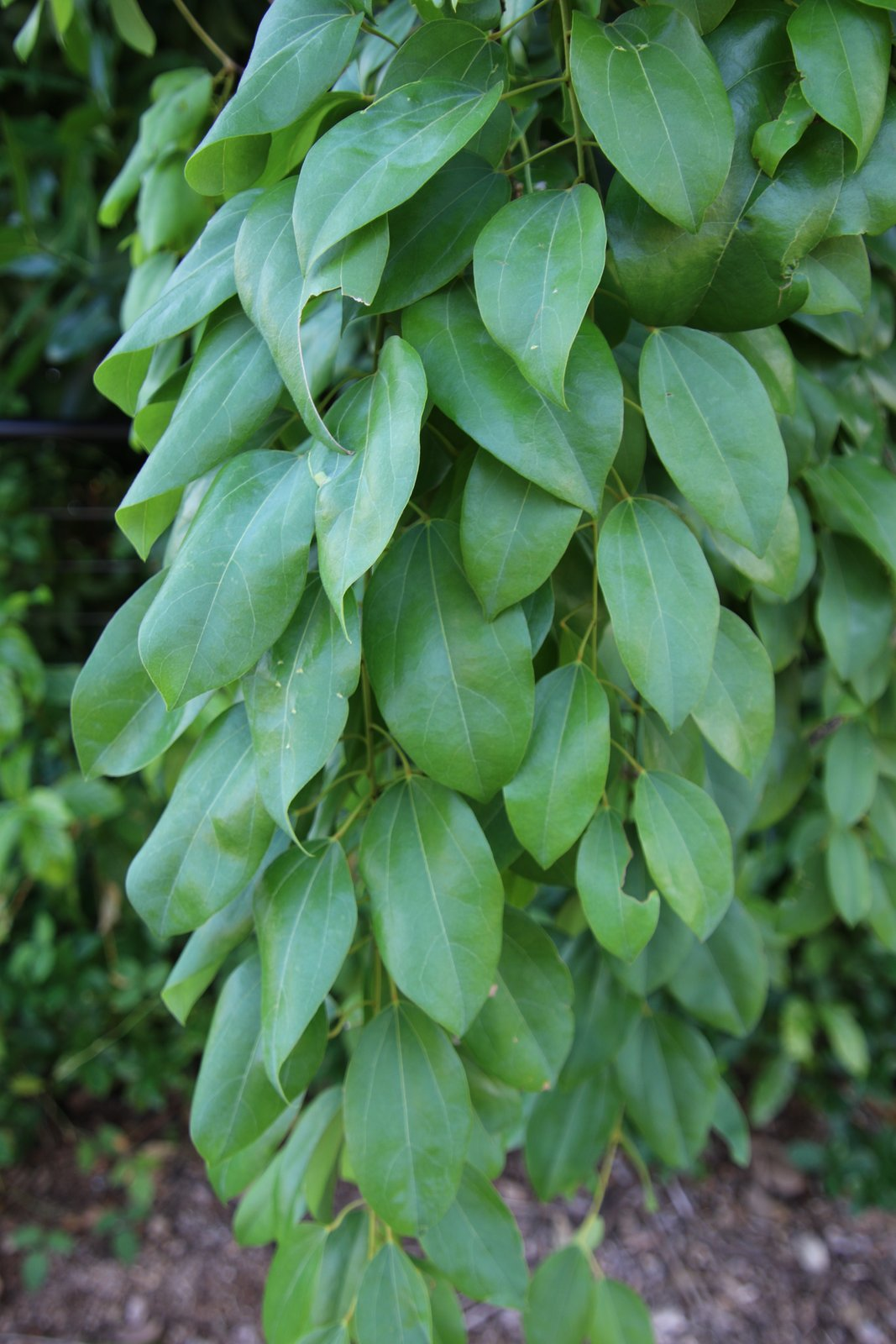
- Pachygone ovata

Scientific classification
- Kingdom: Plantae
- Clade: Tracheophytes
- Clade: Angiosperms
- Clade: Eudicots
- Order: Ranunculales
- Family: Menispermaceae
- Subfamily: Menispermoideae
- Genus: Pachygone; Miers

Synonyms
- Heterotypic Synonyms: Galloa Hassk.; Koon Gaertn.; Tristichocalyx F.Muell.

= Pachygone =

Genus of plants

Pachygone is a genus of flowering plants in the family Menispermaceae. It is native to Tropical Asia and the Pacificand have introduced to Peru.

== Species ==
Accepted species in the genus include:

- Pachygone dasycarpa Kurz
- Pachygone laurifolia (DC.) L.Lian & Wei Wang
- Pachygone ledermannii Diels
- Pachygone loyaltiensis Diels
- Pachygone odorifera Miers
- Pachygone ovata (Poir.) Miers ex Hook.f. & Thomson
- Pachygone poilanei Gagnep.
- Pachygone sinica Diels
- Pachygone tomentella Diels
- Pachygone valida Diels
- Pachygone vitiensis Diels
- Pachygone yunnanensis H.S.Lo
