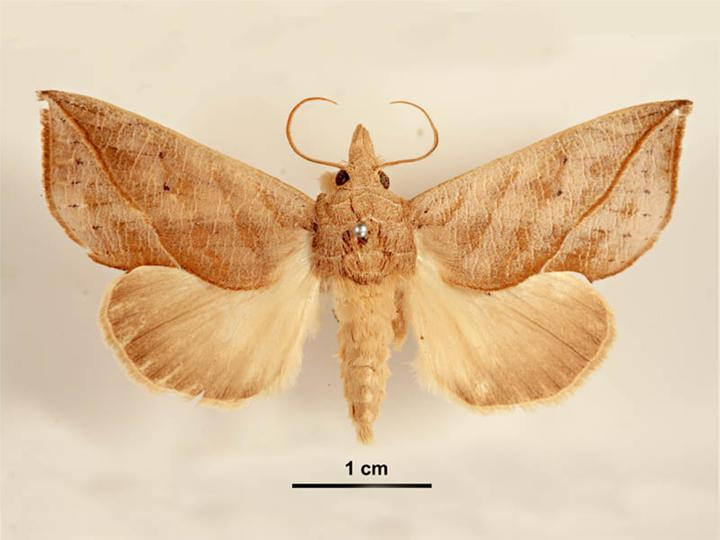
- Dorsal view
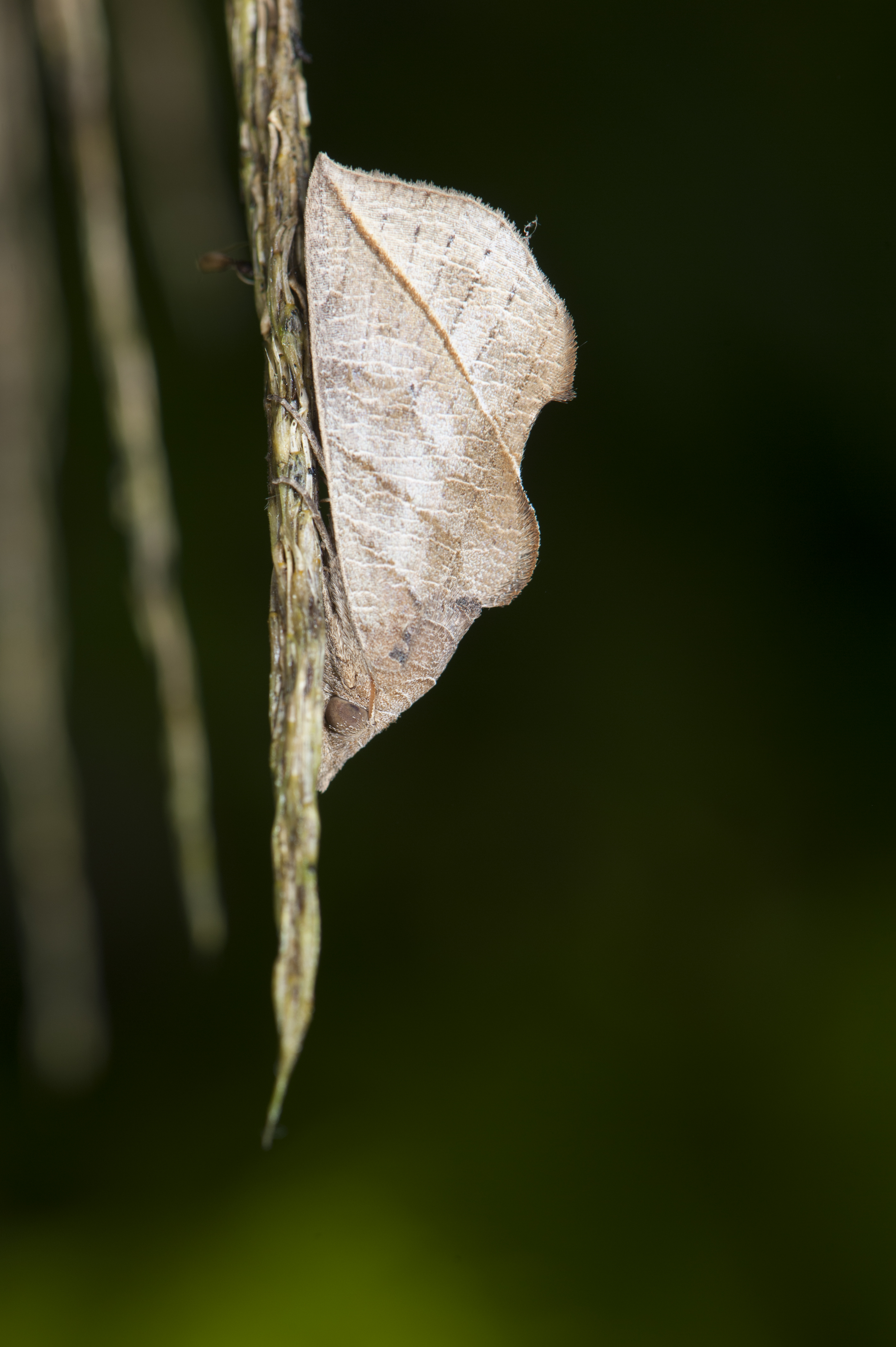

Scientific classification
- Kingdom: Animalia
- Phylum: Arthropoda
- Clade: Pancrustacea
- Class: Insecta
- Order: Lepidoptera
- Superfamily: Noctuoidea
- Family: Erebidae
- Genus: Calyptra
- Species: C. minuticornis

Binomial name
- Calyptra minuticornis (Guenée, 1852)

Synonyms
- Calpe minuticornis Guenée, 1852; Calpe novaepommeraniae Strand, 1919

= Calyptra minuticornis =

Vampire moth

Species of moth

Calyptra minuticornis, the vampire moth, is a moth of the family Erebidae. It has been found in Indonesia, Java, India, Sri Lanka, and Australasia.

== Description ==
Its wingspan is about 50 mm. The antennae of the male are minutely ciliated. Forewings with rounded outer margin. Head and thorax pale reddish brown and thickly irrorated with grey. Abdomen pale fuscous. Forewings with pale red-brown with a silvery sheen and numerous fine pale striae. There are traces of sub-basal, antemedial, and medial oblique line present. A rufous line runs from apex to inner margin beyond middle. A series of submarginal specks present. Hindwings pale fuscous and cilia whitish. Larva olive-grey with a sub-dorsal series of black-bordered yellow spots. A sub-lateral series of specks enclosed from fourth somite by a pinkish bordered black line. Head ochreous, with paired lateral black spots. Legs pale pink.

The caterpillar feeds on Stephania japonica, Cissampelos, Cocculus and Cyclea species. It pupates in a cocoon between joined dead leaves in ground debris. The adult is a fruit piercer and also observed to pierce skins of buffalo, zebu, tapir and even humans in labs to suck blood.
