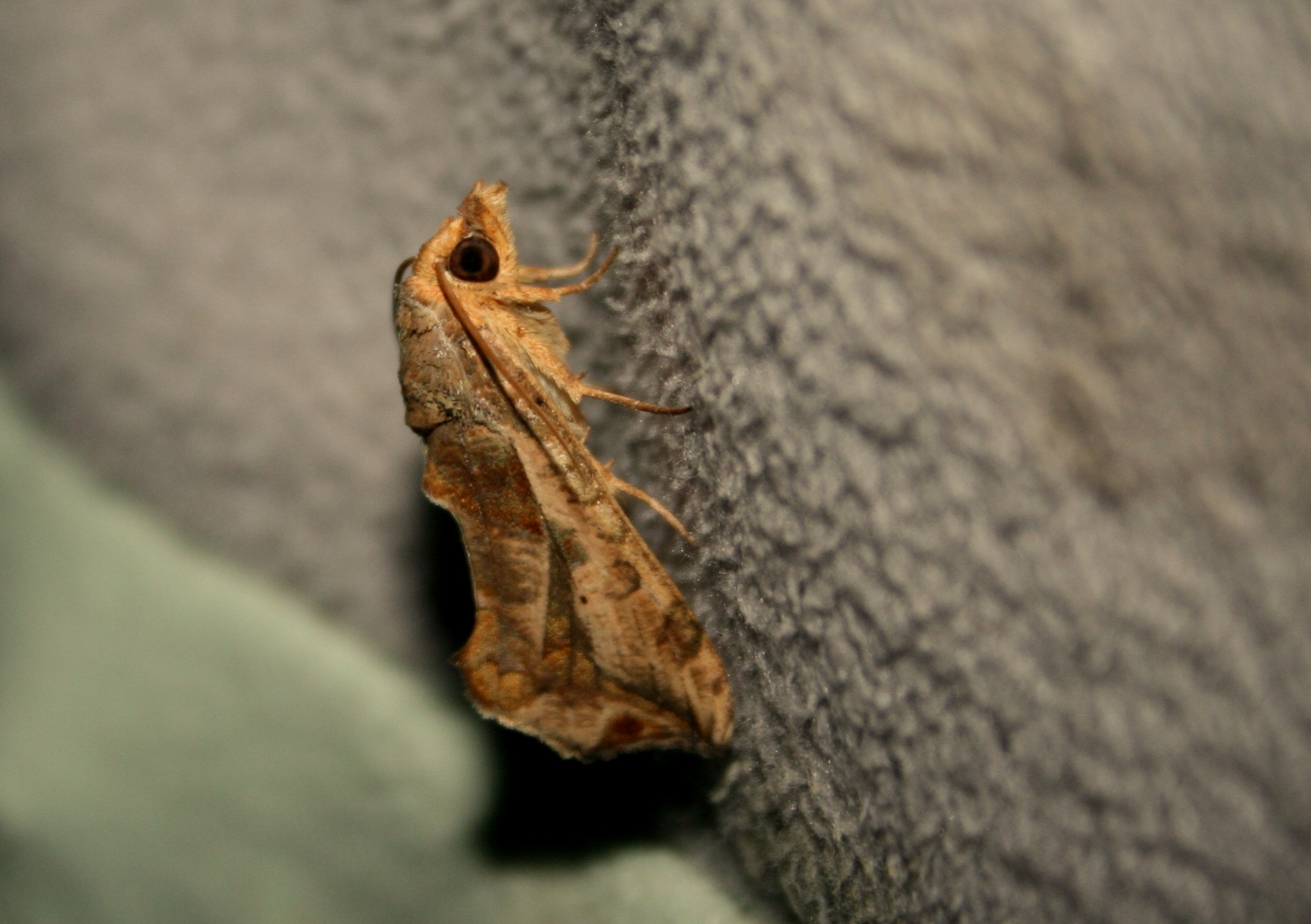

Scientific classification
- Kingdom: Animalia
- Phylum: Arthropoda
- Class: Insecta
- Order: Lepidoptera
- Superfamily: Noctuoidea
- Family: Erebidae
- Genus: Oraesia
- Species: O. emarginata

Binomial name
- Oraesia emarginata (Fabricius, 1794)

Synonyms
- Noctua emarginata Fabricius, 1794; Calpe emarginata; Calyptra emarginata; Oraesia metallescens Guenée, 1852; Oraesia alliciens Walker, [1858]; Oraesia tentans Walker, [1858]; Oraesia camaguina Swinhoe, 1918

= Oraesia emarginata =

Species of moth

Oraesia emarginata is a species of moth of the family Erebidae first described by Johan Christian Fabricius in 1794. It is found in Australia, New Caledonia, Indonesia, New Guinea, Pakistan, the Philippines, India, Sri Lanka, Sulawesi, Taiwan, China, Japan, Korea and Nepal as well as Eritrea, Ethiopia, Kenya, Namibia, Nigeria, South Africa, Tanzania, the Gambia, Uganda, Oman and Yemen.

== Description ==
The wingspan is about 35–42 mm. Antennae of male unipectinate. Palpi with the third joint produced to a point. Forewings with outer margin angled at vein 4. Male has fiery orange head and collar. Thorax reddish brown. Abdomen fuscous. Forewings reddish brown suffused with purple. Numerous indistinct slightly waved oblique lines present. A dark streak found on median nervure. An oblique double line runs from apex to inner margin beyond middle, filled in with pale near apex. The area beyond it suffused with gold colour. Hindwings ochreous white, suffused with fuscous towards outer margin.

Female has much more variegated forewings. A diffused chocolate patch found below middle of cell. A white streak can be seen on vein 2. Abdomen and hindwings fuscous. Larva dark violet brown with a sub-dorsal series of scarlet and yellow spots and sub-lateral white dot series. They pierce fruit (peach, loquat and citrus) to suck the juice.

The larvae feed on Menispermaceae species, including Stephania japonica as well as Cissampelos and Cocculus species. This species overwinters in the larval stage in clusters of weeds and soil cracks around the host plant. Some other food plants are Citrus, Dimocarpus, Ipomoea, Malus pumila, Merremia quinquefolia, Prunus persica, Psidium guajava, Sida, Stephania discolor, Vitis, and Ardenia gummifera.

== Subspecies ==
- Oraesia emarginata emarginata
- Oraesia emarginata defreinai Behounek, Hacker & Speidel, 2010 (Ethiopia, Kenya, Namibia, Nigeria, Oman, South Africa, Tanzania and Yemen)

== Gallery ==
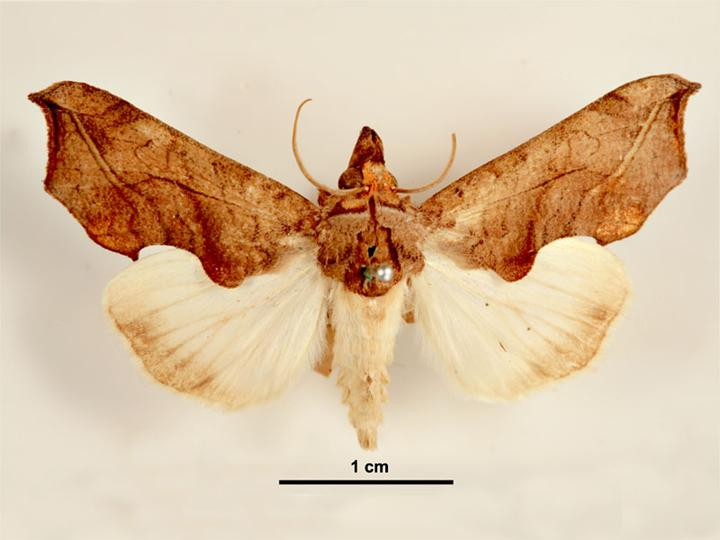
Female, dorsal view

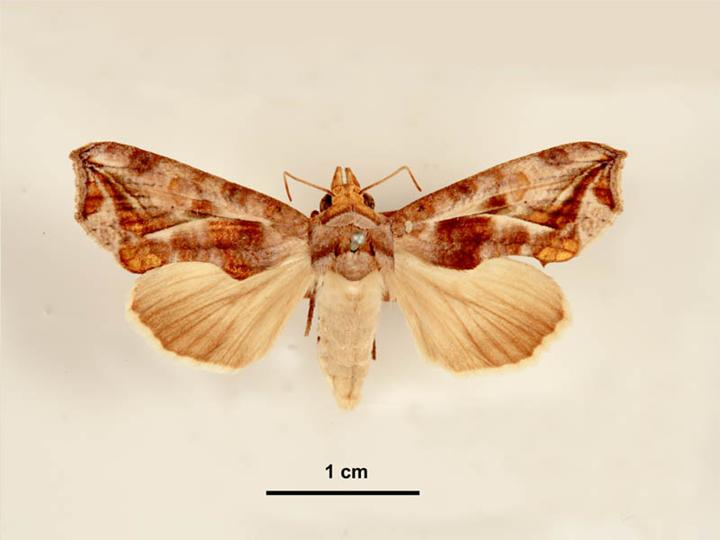
Male, dorsal view

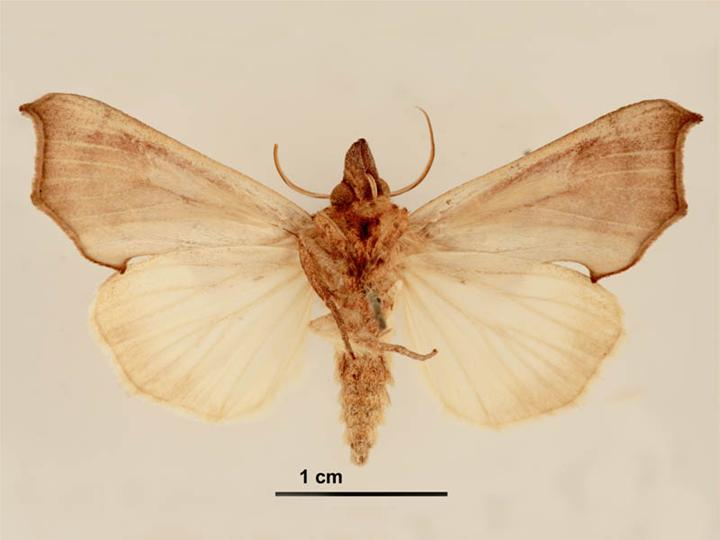
Female, ventral view

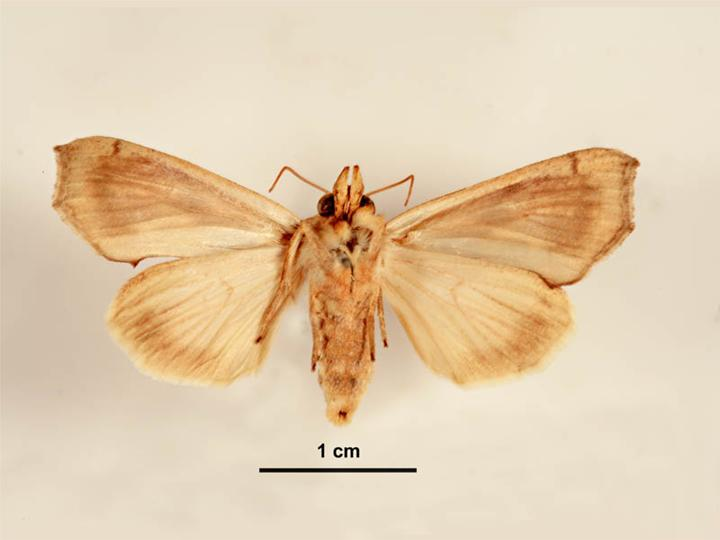
Male, ventral view

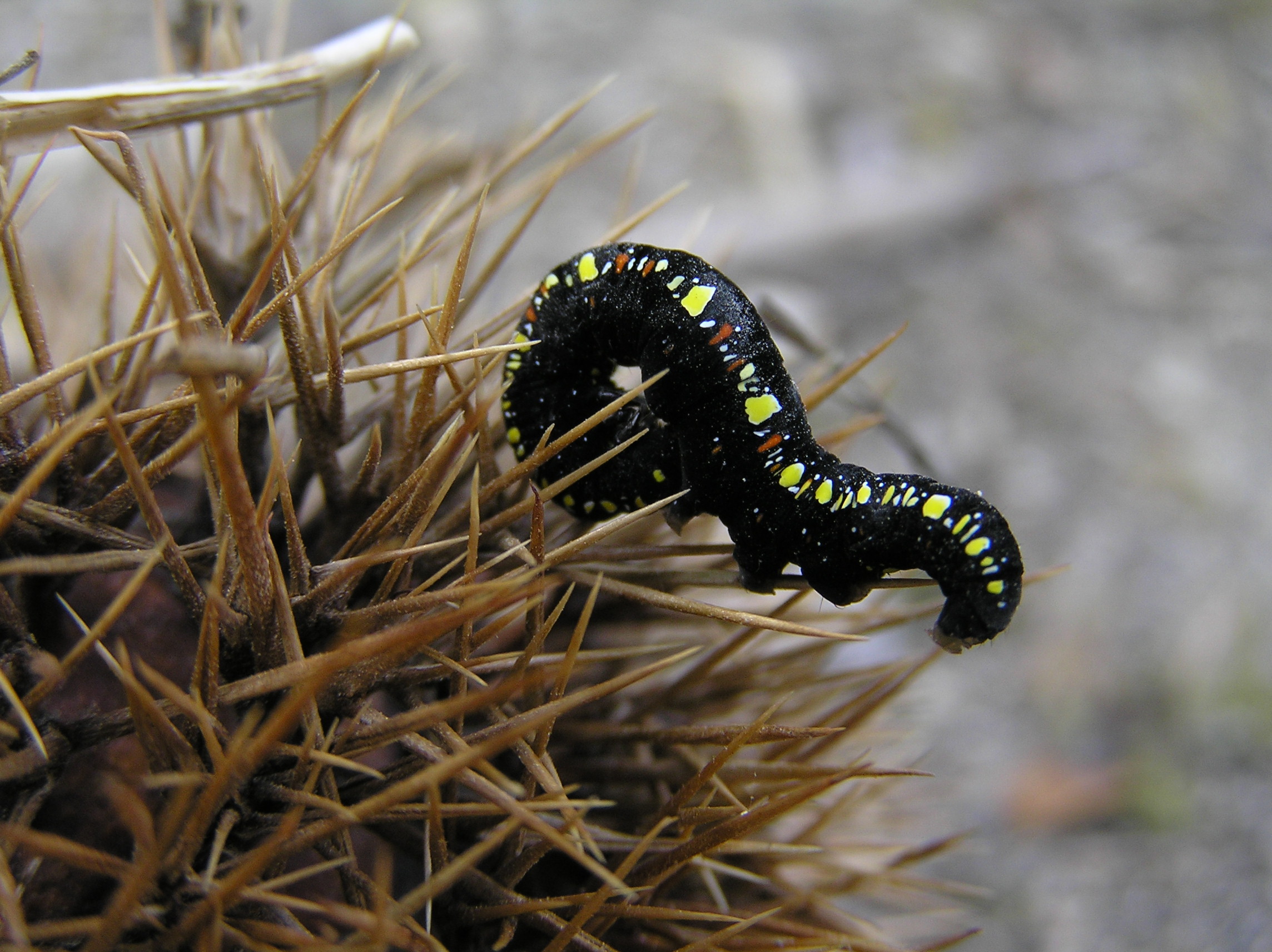
Larva
