= Abuta (disambiguation) =

Abuta is a plant genus in the family Menispermaceae.

Abuta may also refer to:

- Plants in the genus Cissampelos, which are sometimes referred to as abuta for their common name
- Abuta District, Hokkaidō, a district of Hokkaidō, Japan
- Strung disk shell money formerly used in New Guinea
