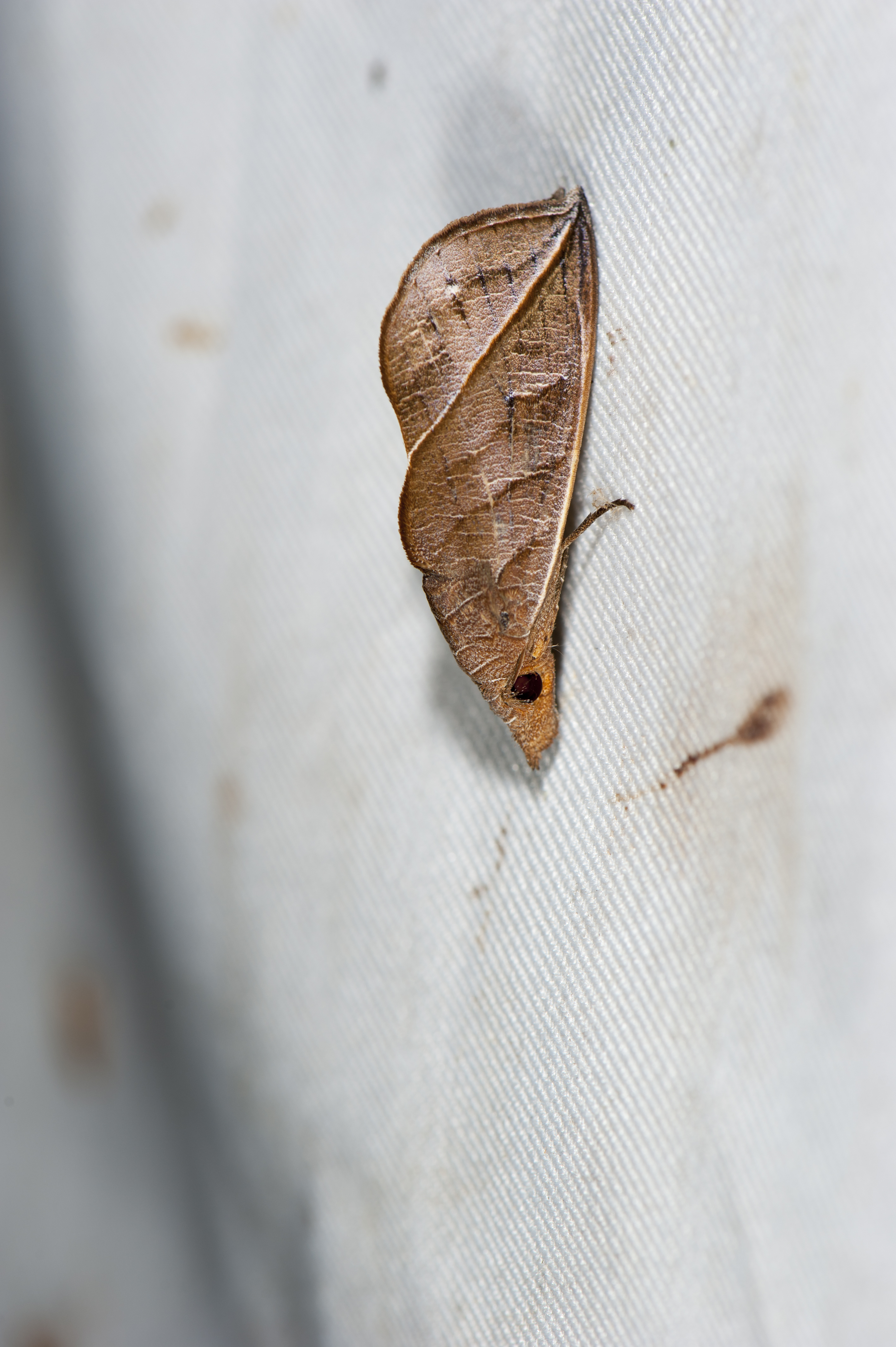
- Calyptra orthograpta

Scientific classification
- Kingdom: Animalia
- Phylum: Arthropoda
- Clade: Pancrustacea
- Class: Insecta
- Order: Lepidoptera
- Superfamily: Noctuoidea
- Family: Erebidae
- Tribe: Calpini
- Genus: Calyptra; Ochsenheimer, 1816

Synonyms
- Calpe Treitschke, 1825; Culasta Moore, 1881; Hypocalpe Butler, 1883; Percalpe Berio, 1956

= Calyptra (moth) =

Genus of moths

The genus Calyptra is a group of moths in subfamily Calpinae of the family Erebidae. They are a member of the Calpini tribe, whose precise circumscription is uncertain but which includes a number of other fruit-piercing or eye-frequenting genera currently classified in Calpinae.

== Etymology ==
The common name of many of these species, vampire moth, refers to the habit that they have of drinking blood from vertebrates. According to a recent study, some of them (C. thalictri) are even capable of drinking human blood through skin. However, the moths are not thought to cause any threat to humans.

Some species of this genus have been classified with genus name Calpe, and they include more than one blood-sucker.

== Description ==
Palpi porrect (extending forward), where the second joint and third joint fringed below with very long hair. The frontal tuft is large, with the metathorax having only very slight tufts. The abdomen features coarse hair on the dorsum; the tibia is spineless, but slightly hairy. The forewings have slightly arched costa. The apex is acute, with the outer margin excurved at vein 3. The inner margin is lobed near the base and at the outer angle. The larvae of the Calyptra moth have three pairs of abdominal prolegs.

== Habitat ==
The Calyptra moth has been observed as changing its habitat in recent years; the species Calyptra thalictri was originally native to Malaysia, the Urals and southern Europe, but has been found in northern Europe. In 2000, they were observed in Finland and in 2008 they were seen further west in Sweden. The Swedish observation was in Skutskär, north of the capital of Stockholm, whilst the sightings in Finland have been more numerous. It is found in southern Finland, in particular in the south east.

Calyptra typically inhabits wetlands, such as ponds or lakes. They are deft fliers, usually active at night when searching for food.

The moth Calyptra thalictri has been seen to be associated with the plant meadow-rue.

== Penetrating skin ==
Insects piercing the skin of mammals are familiar in creatures such as mosquitoes, but the moth uses a specially developed proboscis to penetrate the skin of animals, such as buffalo. A species in Malaysia was observed using its hollowed out proboscis which is divided into two halves. The insect rocks the proboscis from one side to the other, applying pressure until it pierces the skin. It then uses a rocking head motion to drill the tube deeper into the skin. The blood pressure of the victim supplies power to raise hooks on the proboscis to ensure the insect is not easily detached. Only male moths exhibit this ability, unlike mosquitoes, where the female is the one that drinks blood.

It is thought that the moth's ability to pierce animal skin and drink blood may have sprung from an earlier ability to pierce fruit in search of juice. Human skin penetrated in this way may turn red and be sore for several hours leaving an itchy rash. Despite the bite being more severe than that of a mosquito, the moths do not pose a risk to humans.

Although it has been reported that moths have bitten humans in Asia, it was not until the summer of 1999 that a Russian scientist, Vladimir Kononenko, observed that this species of moth was capable of filling its stomach with human blood.

== Species ==
- Calyptra albivirgata Hampson, 1926
- Calyptra bicolor Moore, 1883
- Calyptra canadensis Bethune, 1865 – Canadian owlet moth
- Calyptra eustrigata Hampson, 1926
- Calyptra fasciata Moore, 1882
- Calyptra fletcheri Berio, 1956
- Calyptra gruesa Draudt, 1950
- Calyptra hokkaida Wileman, 1922
- Calyptra imperialis Grünberg, 1910
- Calyptra lata Butler, 1881
- Calyptra minuticornis Guenée, 1852
- Calyptra nyei Bänziger, 1979
- Calyptra ophideroides Guenée, 1852
- Calyptra orthograpta Butler, 1886
- Calyptra parva Bänziger, 1979
- Calyptra pseudobicolor Bänziger, 1979
- Calyptra subnubila Prout, 1928
- Calyptra thalictri Borkhausen, 1790
