= Oraesia provocans =

Provocative calpe

Scientific classification
- Kingdom: Animalia
- Phylum: Arthropoda
- Clade: Pancrustacea
- Class: Insecta
- Order: Lepidoptera
- Superfamily: Noctuoidea
- Family: Erebidae
- Genus: Oraesia
- Species: O. provocans

Binomial name
- Oraesia provocans Walker, 1858

Synonyms
- Oraesia hartmanni Möschler, 1884

Species of moth

Oraesia provocans, the provocative calpe, is a moth of the family Erebidae. The species was first described by Francis Walker in 1858. It is found throughout continental Africa, India and Sri Lanka.

== Description ==
Its wingspan is about 48 mm. Antennae of the male are minutely ciliated. Forewings with angled outer margin. Male has dark palpi. Forewings with a silver streak on vein 2 before the oblique line. A silver streak found at apex and line on outer margin below apex. Female is much darker.

The larvae feed on Cissampelos species and Adenia gummifera.
