= Acrocercops cissiella =

Scientific classification
- Kingdom: Animalia
- Phylum: Arthropoda
- Class: Insecta
- Order: Lepidoptera
- Family: Gracillariidae
- Genus: Acrocercops
- Species: A. cissiella

Binomial name
- Acrocercops cissiella Busck, 1934

Species of moth

Acrocercops cissiella is a moth of the family Gracillariidae. It is known from Cuba.

The larvae feed on Hibiscus elatus, Cissampelos species (including Cissampelos verticillata) and Vitis species. They probably mine the leaves of their host plant.
