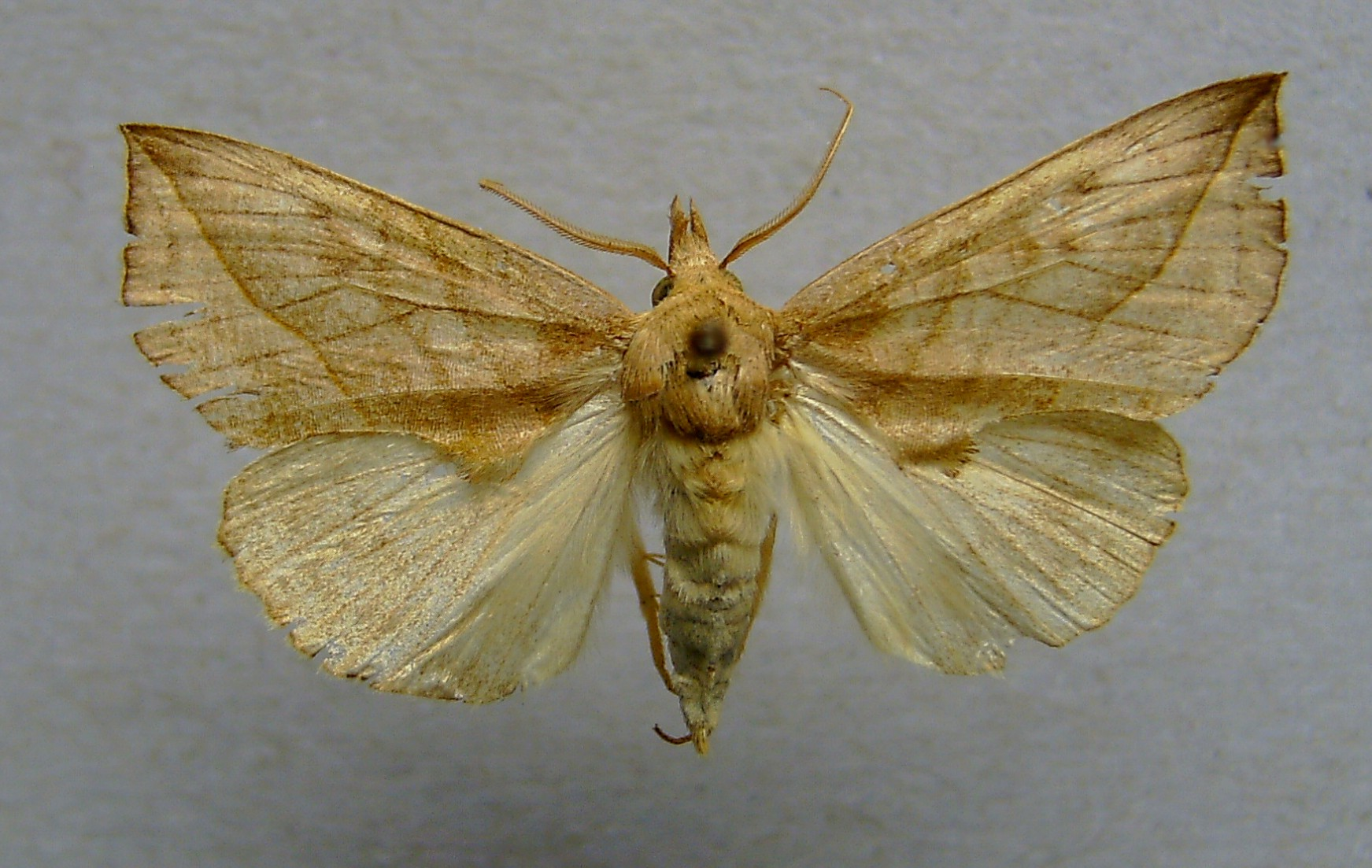

Scientific classification
- Kingdom: Animalia
- Phylum: Arthropoda
- Class: Insecta
- Order: Lepidoptera
- Superfamily: Noctuoidea
- Family: Erebidae
- Genus: Calyptra
- Species: C. thalictri

Binomial name
- Calyptra thalictri (Borkhausen, 1790)

Synonyms
- Phalaena thalictri Borkhausen, 1790; Calpe sodalis Butler, 1878; Calpe capuzina var. centralitalica Dannehl, 1925; Calpe capucina pallida Schwingenschuss, 1938

= Calyptra thalictri =

Species of moth

Calyptra thalictri is a moth of the family Erebidae. It is native to the area ranging from Japan and Korea to China and Malaysia, west through the Urals to Southern Europe, but it has recently expanded its range to northern Europe. In 2000, it was observed in Finland and in 2008 it was recorded even further west, in Sweden.

It is often referred to as the vampire moth (although this common name is also used for other members of the genus Calyptra), referring to their ability to drink blood from vertebrates, including humans, through skin. However, the moths are not thought to cause any threat to humans.

The wingspan is 40–45 mm. The moth flies from May to September depending on the location.

The larvae feed on Thalictrum species.

== Behavior ==
=== Sexual selection ===
This species feeds only on fruit, but during experiments when Russian moths were offered human hands, they drilled their hook-like tongues under the skin and sucked blood. Some moths can suck blood for up to 20 minutes. This is an example of a phenomenon called mud-puddling, in which males aggregate on specific substances to obtain nutrients. Only male moths suck blood. This behavior seems to have evolved so that they may pass on salt to females during copulation, providing a nutritional boost for young larvae who feed on leaf-rich but sodium-poor diets. Blood feeding may have also evolved from animal-related behaviors like feeding on tears, dung, or pus-filled wounds. The increase in blood sucking behavior of these moths is related to the advantage of providing sodium to females to pass on to their offspring. Research has seen morphological changes that reflect this behavior. The number of olfactory sensilla is reduced in C. thalictri males that took a blood meal compared with those that did not in a research environment. The selectivity of sensilla coeloconica olfactory sensory neurons was investigated and demonstrated sensitivity to fifteen vertebrate-related volatiles, including ammonia. The reduction in olfactory sensilla sensitive to vertebrate-related compounds may be correlated to an increase in the likelihood of a male C. thalictri to take a blood meal, leading to sexual selection of such males and an increase on the blood-sucking behavior in the C. thalictri population.

=== Mating and genetic benefits ===
In another species, even from another family, is found, that males and females rely on pheromones using antennae adaptations that allow them to find a mate. Males have such strong receptor capabilities they can sense a female's pheromones within 300 feet, and the pheromones are specific to each so that moths avoid mating with the wrong species. Females release pheromones from a specialized gland in the abdomen to attract males. Males follow the scent of an attractive pheromone, but as they fly they lose specificity and care less about which scent they follow. The attractiveness of a female's pheromone matters less than her ability to make a male smell her scent first before he senses that of another female. Male pheromones convey more detailed information about age, reproductive fitness, and ancestry. Males have a special gene in their antenna that mutates in response to changes in female pheromones. This adaptation to species-specific changes helps ensure that reproduction occurs. Tiny feathery tips along the antenna pick up the slightest hint of pheromone released by females to guide males to their mates. Genes that allow for more refined antenna tips will lead to more reproductively fit males.

=== Mate choice ===
In another species, even from another family, is found, that males and females have specific ways of choosing mates. Females can learn information about males from male pheromones, usually not showing any preference or mate discrimination. Females can be selective at times by secreting very low amounts of pheromones and attract males who have high antenna sensitivity. Males are attracted to the one-billionth of a gram of pheromones released by a female moth for location. Males are more likely to mate with a larger female.
