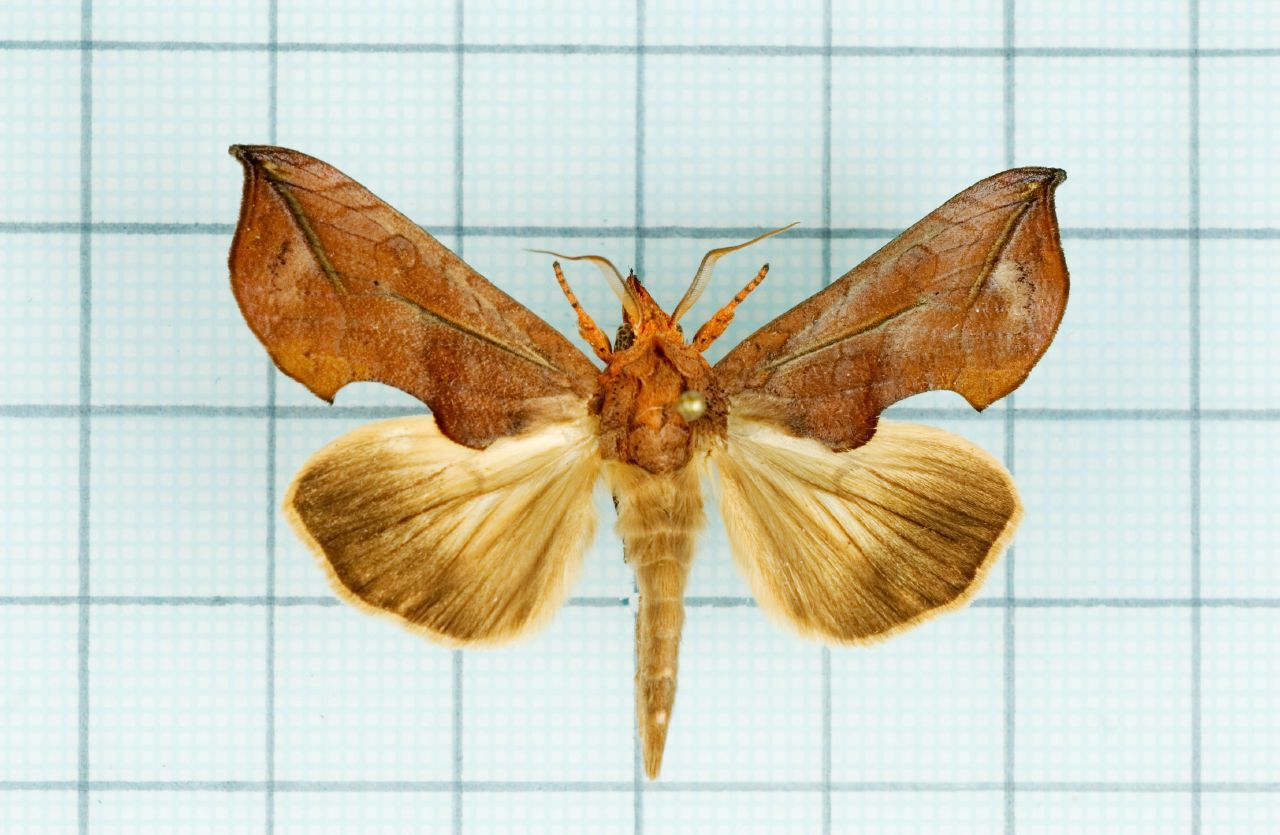

Scientific classification
- Kingdom: Animalia
- Phylum: Arthropoda
- Clade: Pancrustacea
- Class: Insecta
- Order: Lepidoptera
- Superfamily: Noctuoidea
- Family: Erebidae
- Genus: Oraesia
- Species: O. excavata

Binomial name
- Oraesia excavata (Butler, 1878)

Synonyms
- Calpe excavata Butler, 1878

= Oraesia excavata =

Species of moth

Oraesia excavata is a species of moth of the family Erebidae first described by Arthur Gardiner Butler in 1878. It is found in Japan, Korea, China, Thailand and Taiwan and has recently been recorded from Hawaii.

Adults are orange and mimic a dead leaf. They pierce fruit (including prune, citrus, grape, peach, pear, apple, guava, papaya, mango, banana and loquat) to suck the juice.

The larvae feed on Menispermaceae species, possibly including Cocculus orbiculatus, Lepisanthes rubiginosa and Stephania japonica.
