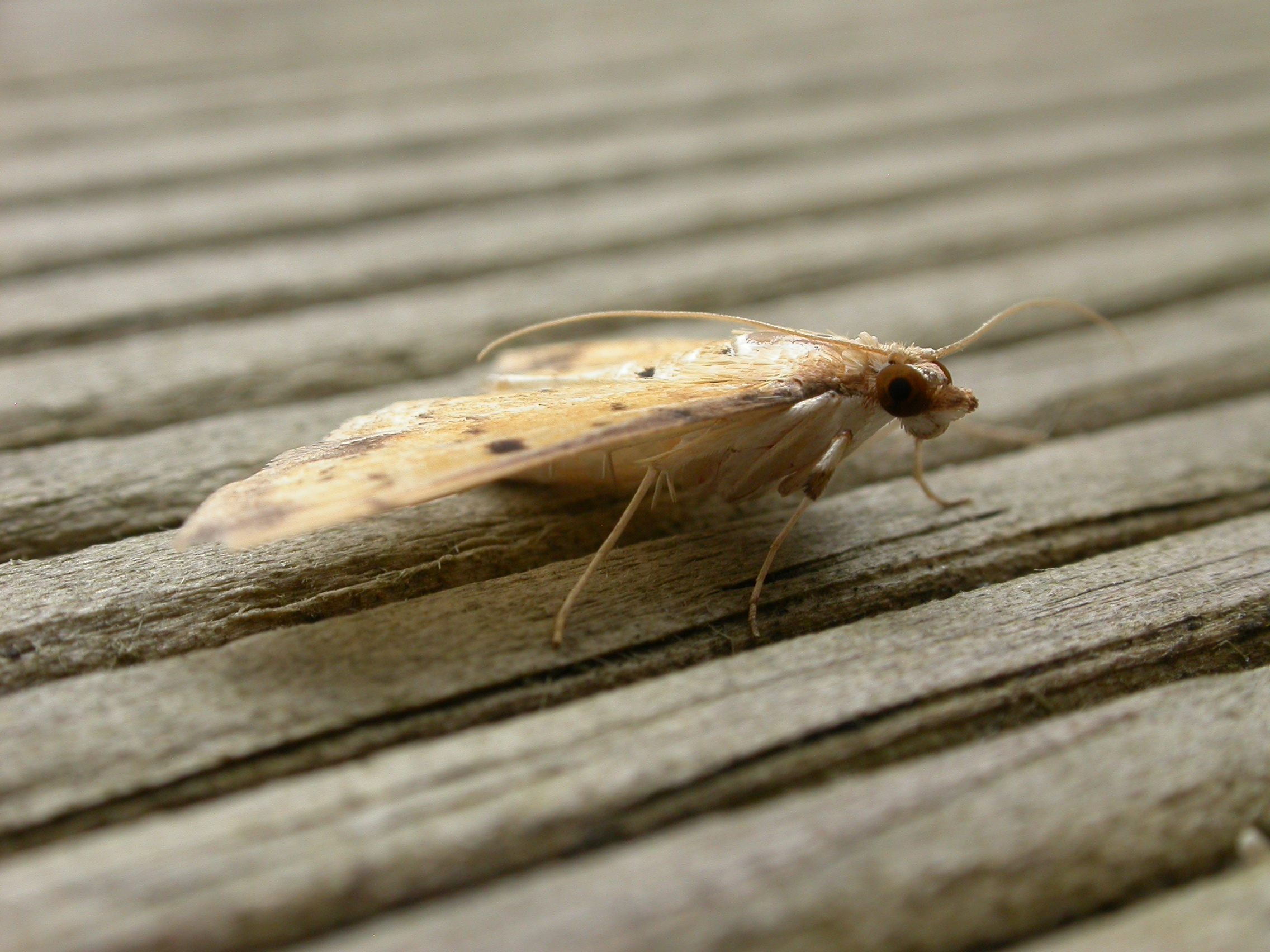

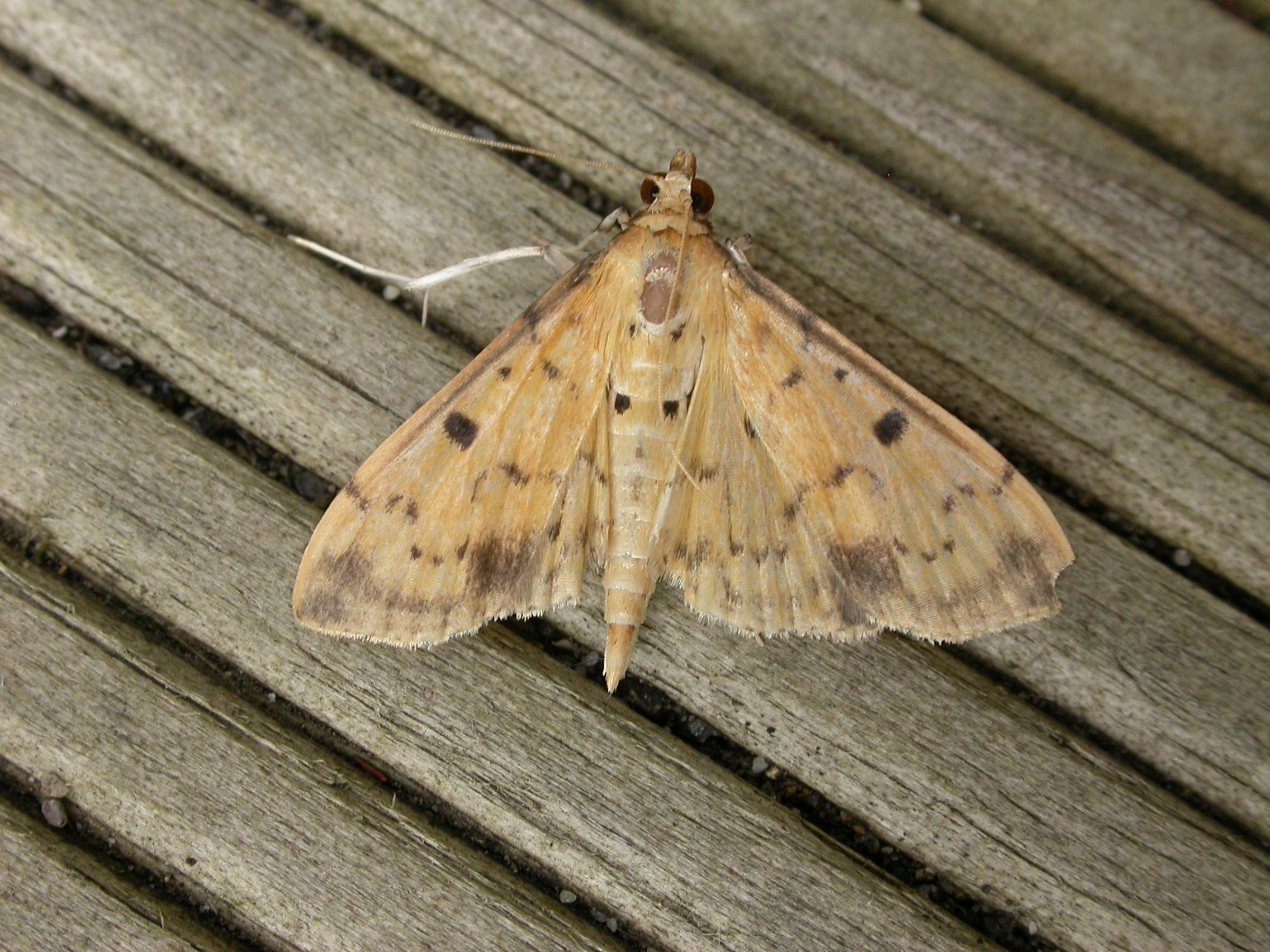

Scientific classification
- Kingdom: Animalia
- Phylum: Arthropoda
- Class: Insecta
- Order: Lepidoptera
- Family: Crambidae
- Genus: Herpetogramma
- Species: H. cynaralis

Binomial name
- Herpetogramma cynaralis (Walker, 1859)

Synonyms
- Botys cynaralis Walker, 1859; Botys quadriguttalis Walker, 1866; Hapalia marginalis Moore, 1886; Botys epitrota Meyrick, 1887

= Herpetogramma cynaralis =

Species of moth

Herpetogramma cynaralis is a species of moth of the family Crambidae. It is found in Japan, Taiwan, Jeju Island (Korea), China, Malaysia, India, and Australia, where it has been recorded from Queensland.

The wingspan is 20 mm (0.79 in) in females. In Australia, the larvae feed on Stephania japonica var. discolor.
