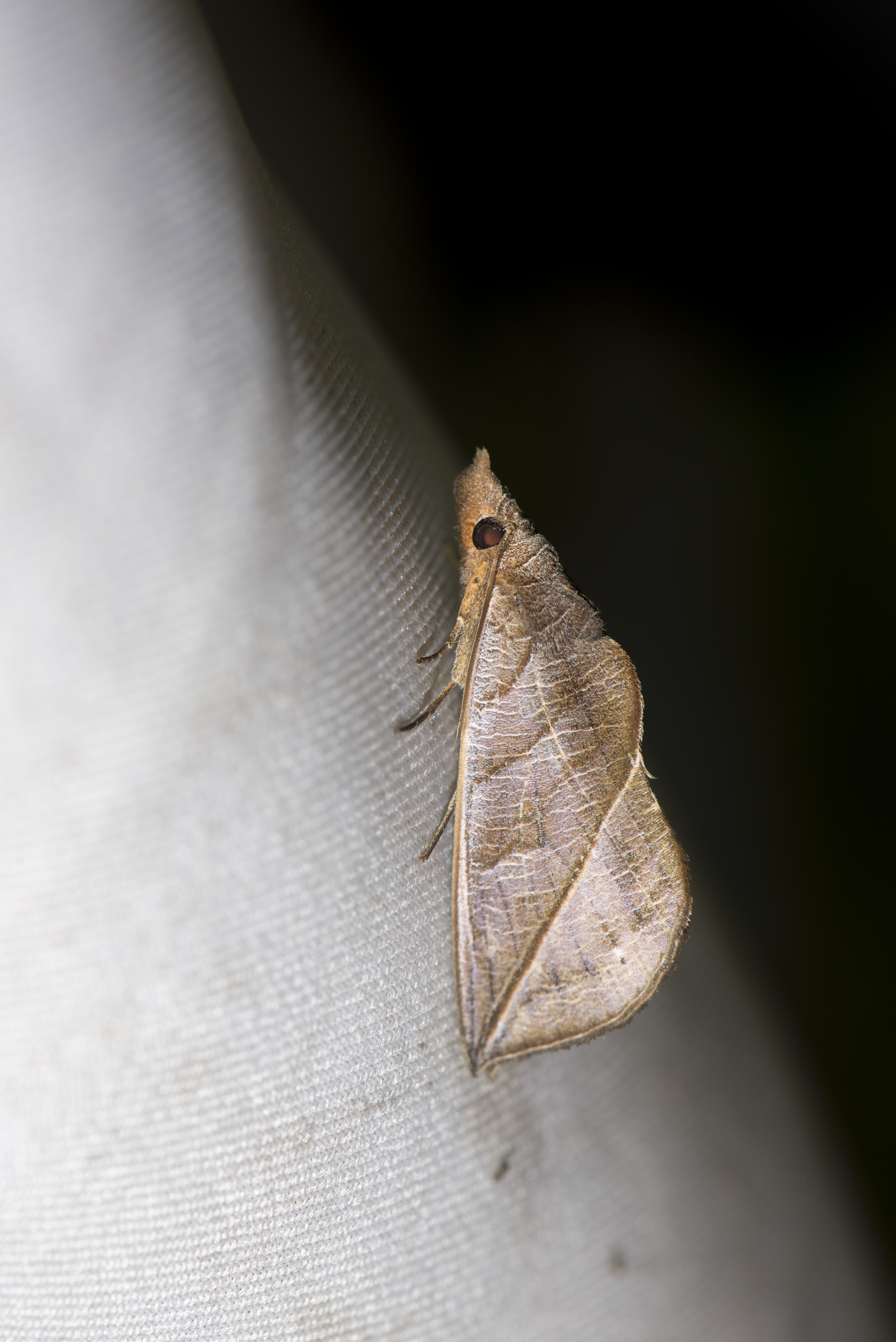

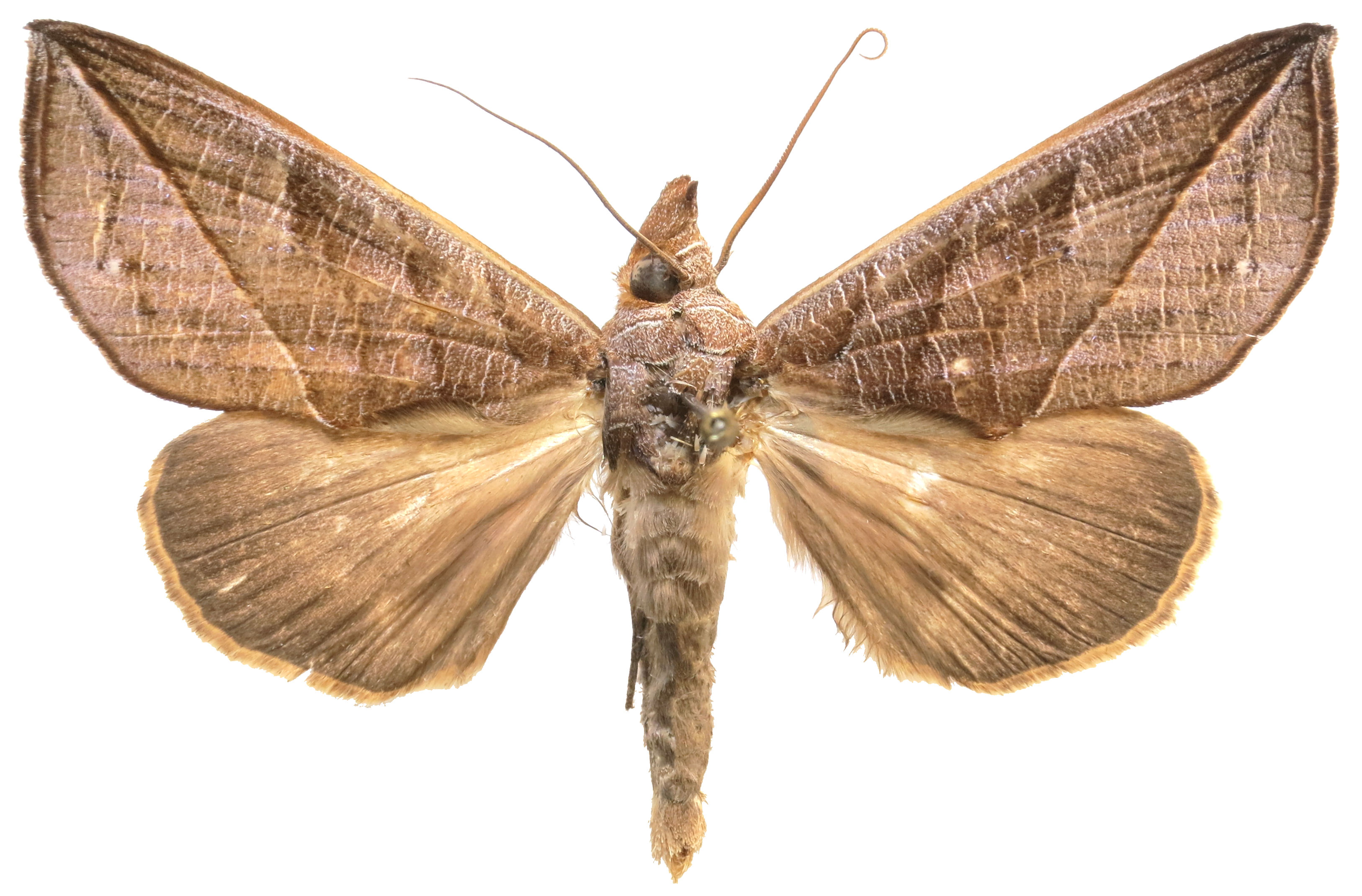
- C. orthograpta - Kangding, Sichuan, China

Scientific classification
- Kingdom: Animalia
- Phylum: Arthropoda
- Clade: Pancrustacea
- Class: Insecta
- Order: Lepidoptera
- Superfamily: Noctuoidea
- Family: Erebidae
- Genus: Calyptra
- Species: C. orthograpta

Binomial name
- Calyptra orthograpta (Butler, 1886)

Synonyms
- Calpe orthographa Butler, 1886; Calpe striata Poujade, 1887; Calyptra orthographa

= Calyptra orthograpta =

Species of moth

Calyptra orthograpta is a moth of the family Erebidae. It has been found in China and India. It has been noted to be a relatively rare species.
