= Oraesia triobliqua =

Scientific classification
- Kingdom: Animalia
- Phylum: Arthropoda
- Clade: Pancrustacea
- Class: Insecta
- Order: Lepidoptera
- Superfamily: Noctuoidea
- Family: Erebidae
- Genus: Oraesia
- Species: O. triobliqua

Binomial name
- Oraesia triobliqua (Saalmüller, 1880)

Synonyms
- Odontina Triobliqua Saalmüller, 1891

Species of moth

Oraesia triobliqua is a species of moth of the family Erebidae first described by Max Saalmüller in 1880. It is found in northern Madagascar.

It has a wingspan of 40 mm.
