= Calyptra ophideroides =

Scientific classification
- Kingdom: Animalia
- Phylum: Arthropoda
- Clade: Pancrustacea
- Class: Insecta
- Order: Lepidoptera
- Superfamily: Noctuoidea
- Family: Erebidae
- Genus: Calyptra
- Species: C. ophideroides

Binomial name
- Calyptra ophideroides (Guenée, 1852)

Synonyms
- Calpe ophideroides Guenée, 1852

Species of moth

Calyptra ophideroides is a moth of the family Erebidae. It is found in East Indies. It has been known to feed on humans, as well as a variety of other mammals.
