= Calyptra albivirgata =

Scientific classification
- Kingdom: Animalia
- Phylum: Arthropoda
- Clade: Pancrustacea
- Class: Insecta
- Order: Lepidoptera
- Superfamily: Noctuoidea
- Family: Erebidae
- Genus: Calyptra
- Species: C. albivirgata

Binomial name
- Calyptra albivirgata (Hampson, 1926)

Synonyms
- Calpe albivirgata Hampson, 1926

Species of moth

Calyptra albivirgata is a moth of the family Erebidae first described by George Hampson in 1926. It is found in Asia, including China and Japan.
