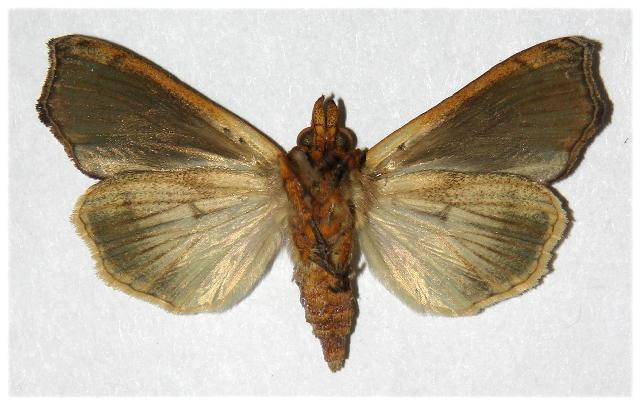

Scientific classification
- Kingdom: Animalia
- Phylum: Arthropoda
- Clade: Pancrustacea
- Class: Insecta
- Order: Lepidoptera
- Superfamily: Noctuoidea
- Family: Erebidae
- Genus: Oraesia
- Species: O. nobilis

Binomial name
- Oraesia nobilis (Felder and Rogenhofer, 1874)

= Oraesia nobilis =

Species of moth

Oraesia nobilis is a species of moth of the family Erebidae first described by Cajetan von Felder and Alois Friedrich Rogenhofer in 1874. It is found in Costa Rica, Nicaragua, French Guiana, Peru and Brazil.
