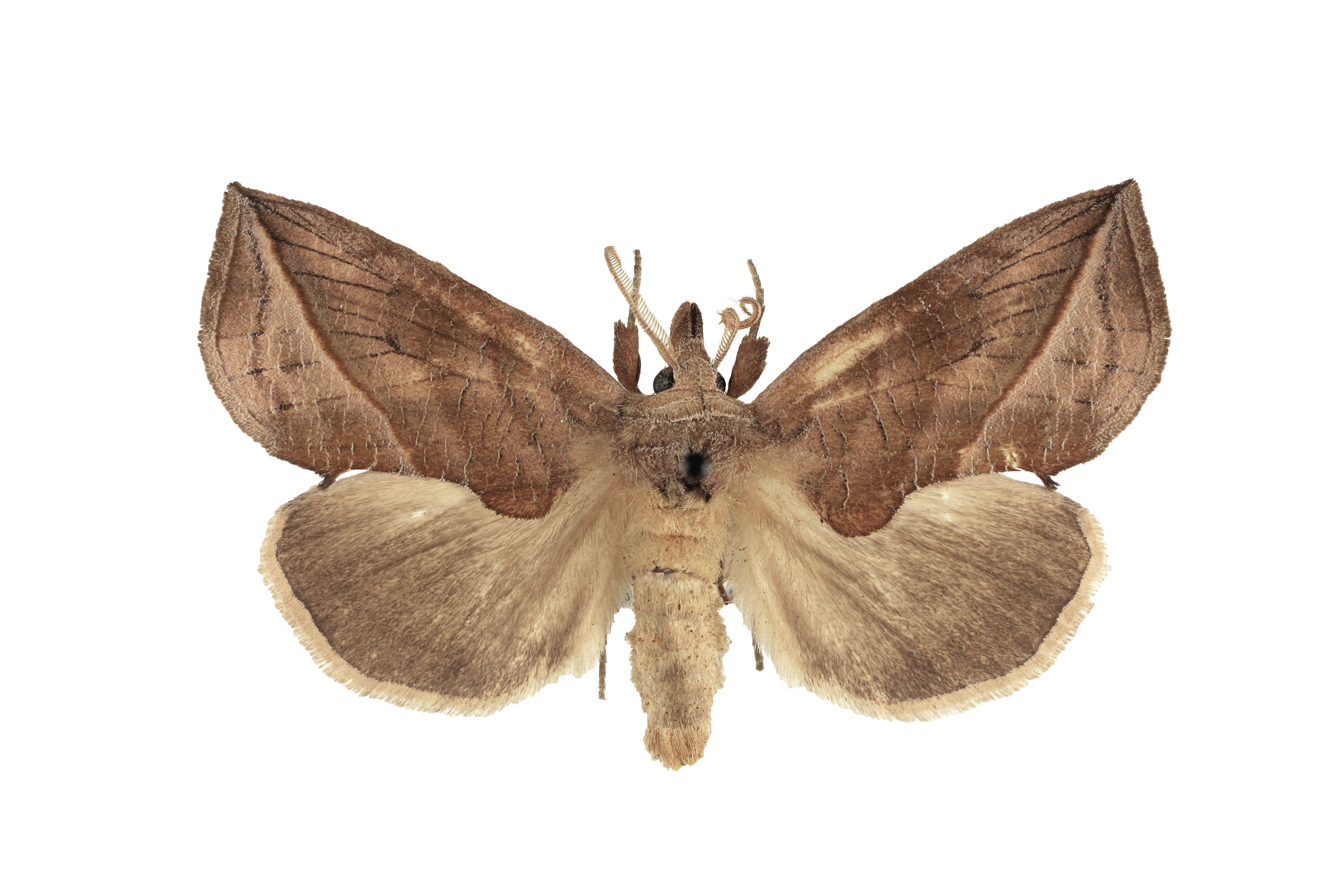

Scientific classification
- Kingdom: Animalia
- Phylum: Arthropoda
- Clade: Pancrustacea
- Class: Insecta
- Order: Lepidoptera
- Superfamily: Noctuoidea
- Family: Erebidae
- Genus: Calyptra
- Species: C. canadensis

Binomial name
- Calyptra canadensis (Bethune, 1865)

Synonyms
- Calpe canadensis Bethune, 1865; Plusiodonta purpurascens Walker, 1865; Oraesia sobria Walker, 1865; Percalpe canadensis

= Calyptra canadensis =

Canadian owlet

Species of moth

Calyptra canadensis, the Canadian owlet or meadow rue owlet moth, is a moth of the family Erebidae. The species was first described by Charles J. S. Bethune in 1865. It is found in North America from Nova Scotia to North Carolina in mountains, west to Texas, north to Saskatchewan, and occasionally Alberta. This species has been also observed in Ontario. It is the only insect from the Calyptra genus to habitat North America. Adults of this species feeds on fruit.

The wingspan is 33–40 mm. The moth flies from June to September depending on the location.

The larvae feed on Thalictrum species.
