= Calyptra eustrigata =

Scientific classification
- Kingdom: Animalia
- Phylum: Arthropoda
- Clade: Pancrustacea
- Class: Insecta
- Order: Lepidoptera
- Superfamily: Noctuoidea
- Family: Erebidae
- Genus: Calyptra
- Species: C. eustrigata

Binomial name
- Calyptra eustrigata (Hampson, 1926)

Synonyms
- Calpe eustrigata Hampson, 1926

Species of moth

Calyptra eustrigata is a moth of the family Erebidae, found in Sri Lanka and Malaysia. It has been reported as exhibiting parasitic blood-sucking behavior.
