= Calyptra lata =

Scientific classification
- Kingdom: Animalia
- Phylum: Arthropoda
- Clade: Pancrustacea
- Class: Insecta
- Order: Lepidoptera
- Superfamily: Noctuoidea
- Family: Erebidae
- Genus: Calyptra
- Species: C. lata

Binomial name
- Calyptra lata (Butler, 1881)

Synonyms
- Calpe lata Butler, 1881; Calpe aureola Graeser, 1889

Species of moth

Calyptra lata is a moth of the family Erebidae. It has been found in Japan and far-east Russia. The larvae length of C. lata is roughly 45 millimetres (1.8 in).
