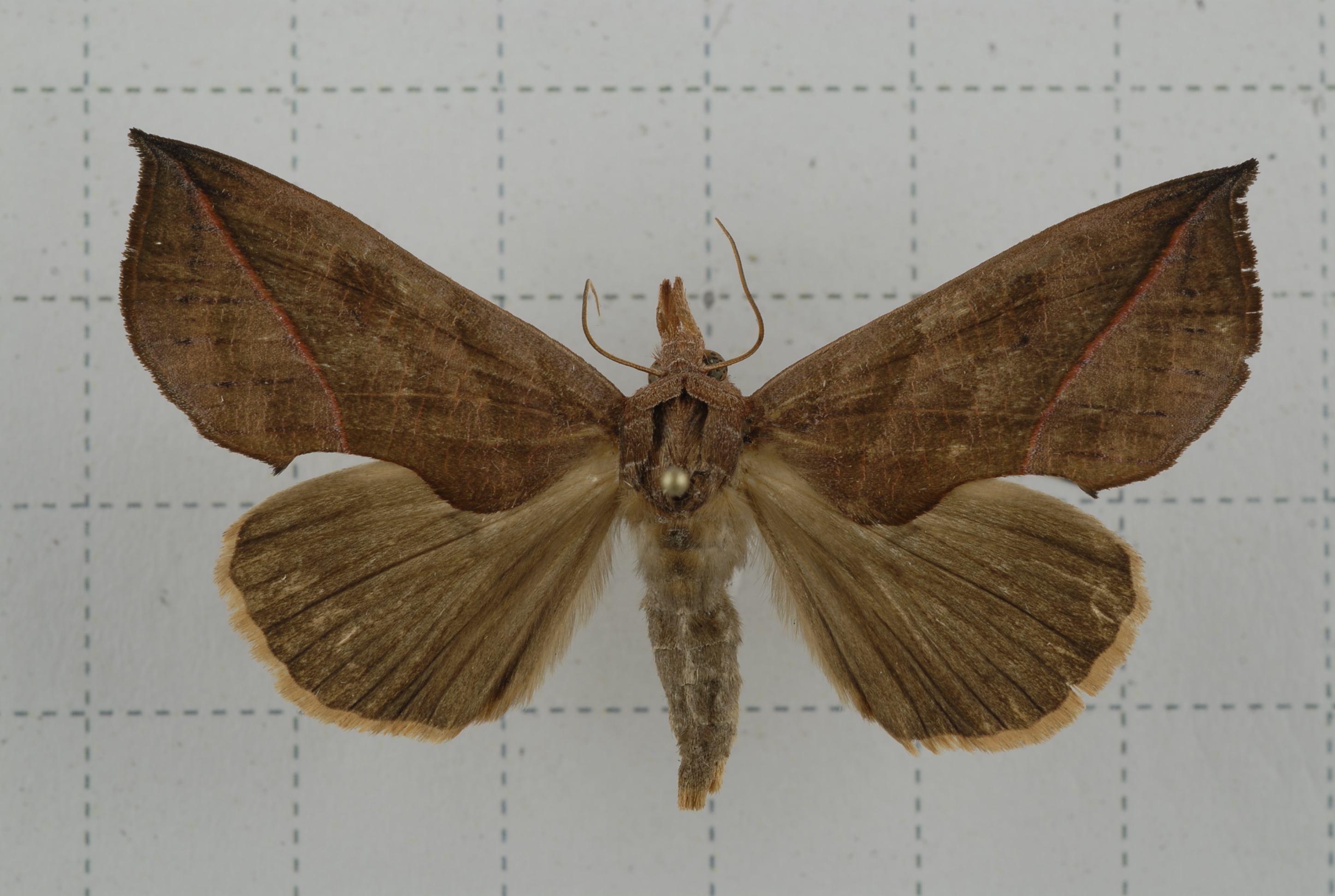

Scientific classification
- Kingdom: Animalia
- Phylum: Arthropoda
- Clade: Pancrustacea
- Class: Insecta
- Order: Lepidoptera
- Superfamily: Noctuoidea
- Family: Erebidae
- Genus: Calyptra
- Species: C. fletcheri

Binomial name
- Calyptra fletcheri (Berio, 1956)

Synonyms
- Calpe fletcheri Berio, 1956

= Calyptra fletcheri =

Species of moth

Calyptra fletcheri is a moth of the family Erebidae. It has been found in China.
