= Calyptra pseudobicolor =

Scientific classification
- Kingdom: Animalia
- Phylum: Arthropoda
- Clade: Pancrustacea
- Class: Insecta
- Order: Lepidoptera
- Superfamily: Noctuoidea
- Family: Erebidae
- Genus: Calyptra
- Species: C. pseudobicolor

Binomial name
- Calyptra pseudobicolor (Bänziger, 1979)

Species of moth

Calyptra pseudobicolor is a moth of the family Erebidae. It is found in India. It has been known to feed on humans, as well as a variety of other mammals.
