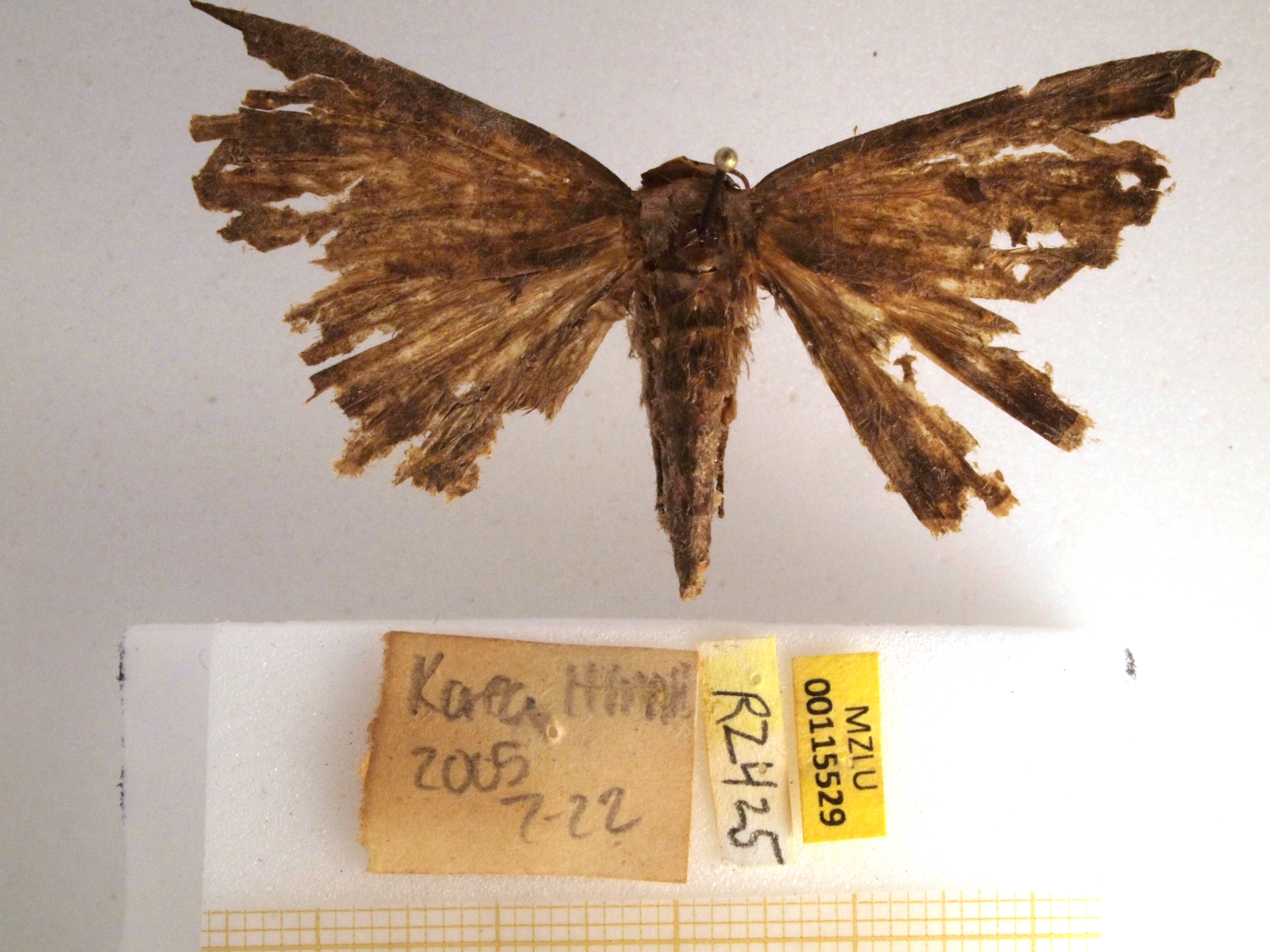

Scientific classification
- Kingdom: Animalia
- Phylum: Arthropoda
- Clade: Pancrustacea
- Class: Insecta
- Order: Lepidoptera
- Superfamily: Noctuoidea
- Family: Erebidae
- Genus: Calyptra
- Species: C. gruesa

Binomial name
- Calyptra gruesa (Draudt, 1950)

Synonyms
- Calpe gruesa Draudt, 1950

= Calyptra gruesa =

Species of moth

Calyptra gruesa is a moth of the family Erebidae. It has been found in China. C. gruesa has a wingspan range of 25 to 29 millimetres (0.98 to 1.14 in).
