= Calyptra hokkaida =

Scientific classification
- Kingdom: Animalia
- Phylum: Arthropoda
- Clade: Pancrustacea
- Class: Insecta
- Order: Lepidoptera
- Superfamily: Noctuoidea
- Family: Erebidae
- Genus: Calyptra
- Species: C. hokkaida

Binomial name
- Calyptra hokkaida (Wileman, 1922)

Synonyms
- Calype hokkaida Wileman, 1922; Calpe hokkaido (misspelling) Poole, 1989; Calpe hoenei Berio, 1956

Species of moth

Calyptra hokkaida is a moth of the family Erebidae. It has been found in China and Japan. The larvae length of C. hokkaido is roughly 40 millimetres (1.6 in).
