= Calyptra nyei =

Scientific classification
- Kingdom: Animalia
- Phylum: Arthropoda
- Clade: Pancrustacea
- Class: Insecta
- Order: Lepidoptera
- Superfamily: Noctuoidea
- Family: Erebidae
- Genus: Calyptra
- Species: C. nyei

Binomial name
- Calyptra nyei Bänziger, 1979

Species of moth

Calyptra nyei is a moth of the family Erebidae. It has been found in India.
