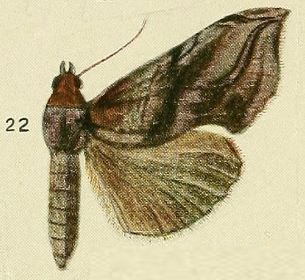

Scientific classification
- Kingdom: Animalia
- Phylum: Arthropoda
- Clade: Pancrustacea
- Class: Insecta
- Order: Lepidoptera
- Superfamily: Noctuoidea
- Family: Erebidae
- Genus: Oraesia
- Species: O. cerne

Binomial name
- Oraesia cerne (Fawcett, 1916)

Synonyms
- Calpe cerne Fawcett, 1916

= Oraesia cerne =

Species of moth

Oraesia cerne is a species of moth of the family Erebidae first described by James Farish Malcolm Fawcett in 1916. It is found in Ghana Ivory Coast, the Democratic Republic of the Congo and Ethiopia.
