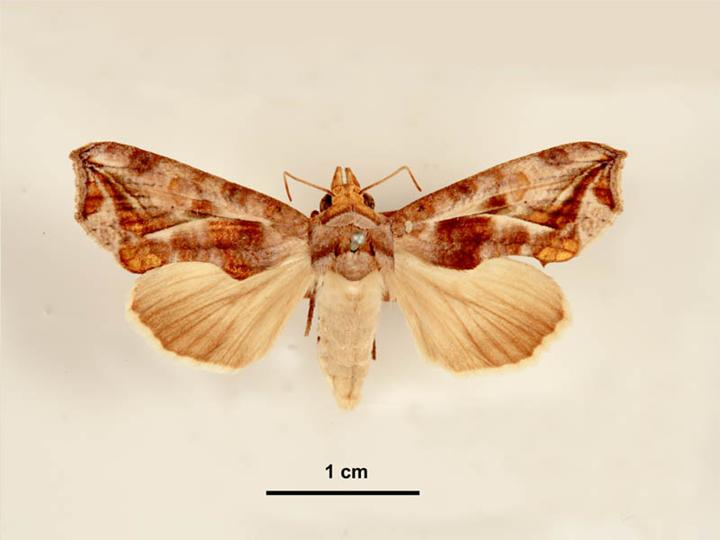
- Male Oraesia emarginata

Scientific classification
- Kingdom: Animalia
- Phylum: Arthropoda
- Clade: Pancrustacea
- Class: Insecta
- Order: Lepidoptera
- Superfamily: Noctuoidea
- Family: Erebidae
- Tribe: Calpini
- Genus: Oraesia; Guenée in Boisduval & Guenée, 1852

= Oraesia =

Genus of moths

Oraesia is a genus of moths in the family Erebidae. The genus was erected by Achille Guenée in 1852.

== Species ==
- Oraesia aeneofusa Hampson, 1926
- Oraesia albescens Seitz, 1940
- Oraesia argyrolampra Hampson, 1926
- Oraesia argyrosema Hampson, 1926
- Oraesia argyrosigna Moore, 1884
- Oraesia basiplaga Walker, 1865
- Oraesia cerne Fawcett, 1916
- Oraesia emarginata (Fabricius, 1794)
- Oraesia excavata (Butler, 1878)
- Oraesia excitans Walker, 1857
- Oraesia glaucocheila Hampson, 1926
- Oraesia honesta Walker, 1857
- Oraesia igneceps Hampson, 1926
- Oraesia nobilis Felder & Rogenhofer, 1874
- Oraesia pierronii Mabille, 1880
- Oraesia provocans Walker, 1857
- Oraesia rectistria Guenée in Boisduval & Guenée, 1852
- Oraesia serpens Schaus, 1898
- Oraesia striolata Schaus, 1911
- Oraesia stupenda Dognin, 1912
- Oraesia subucula Dognin, 1910
- Oraesia triobliqua Saalmüller, 1880
- Oraesia wintgensi Strand, 1909
