= Calyptra subnubila =

Scientific classification
- Kingdom: Animalia
- Phylum: Arthropoda
- Clade: Pancrustacea
- Class: Insecta
- Order: Lepidoptera
- Superfamily: Noctuoidea
- Family: Erebidae
- Genus: Calyptra
- Species: C. subnubila

Binomial name
- Calyptra subnubila (Prout, 1928)

Synonyms
- Calpe subnubila Prout, 1928

Species of moth

Calyptra subnubila is a moth of the family Erebidae. It has been found in Indonesia.
