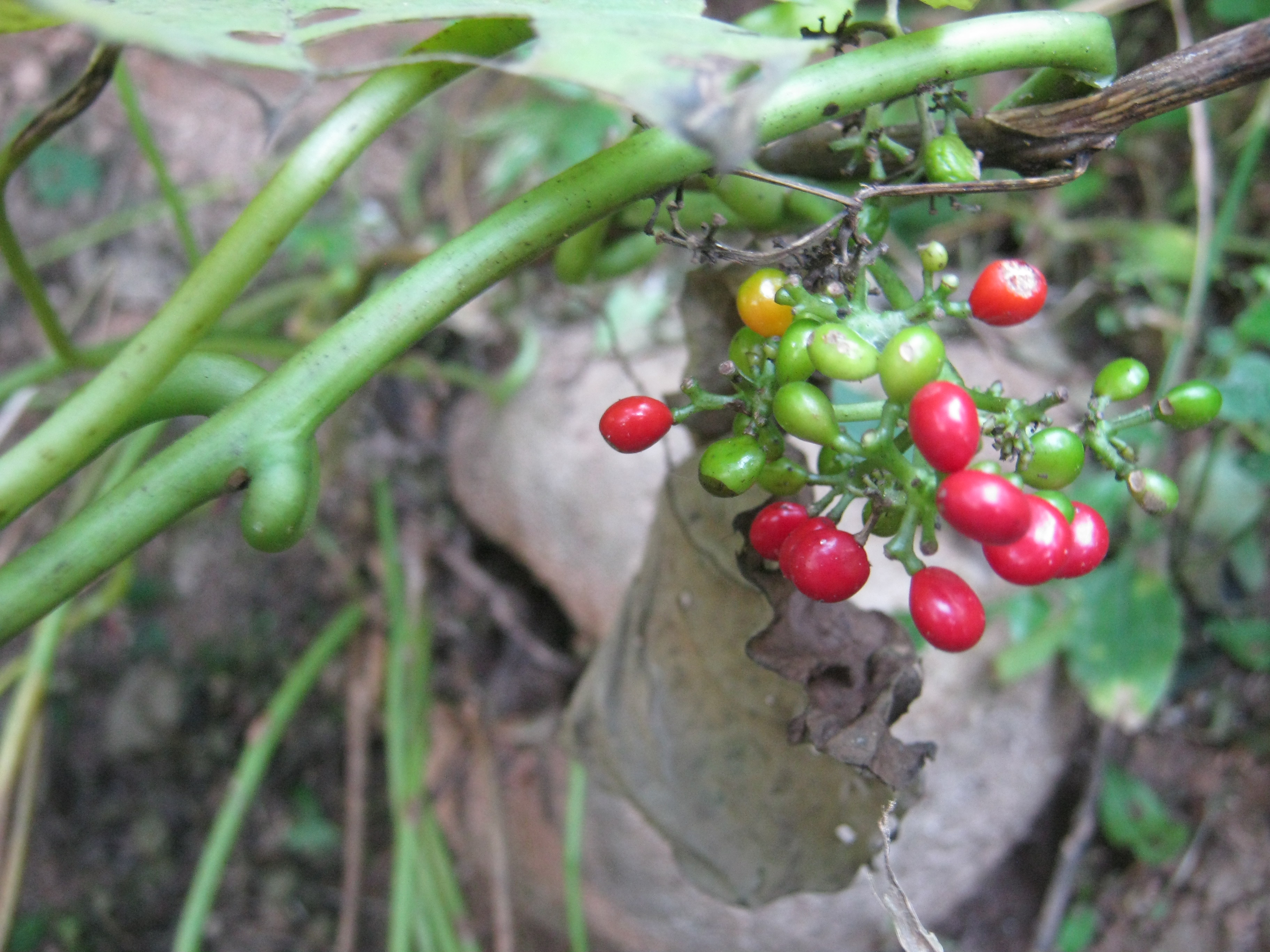
- Cissampelos pareira with fruits found in Panchkhal, Nepal

Scientific classification
- Kingdom: Plantae
- Clade: Embryophytes
- Clade: Tracheophytes
- Clade: Angiosperms
- Clade: Eudicots
- Order: Ranunculales
- Family: Menispermaceae
- Genus: Cissampelos
- Species: C. pareira

Binomial name
- Cissampelos pareira L.

= Cissampelos pareira =

Velvetleaf

Species of flowering plant

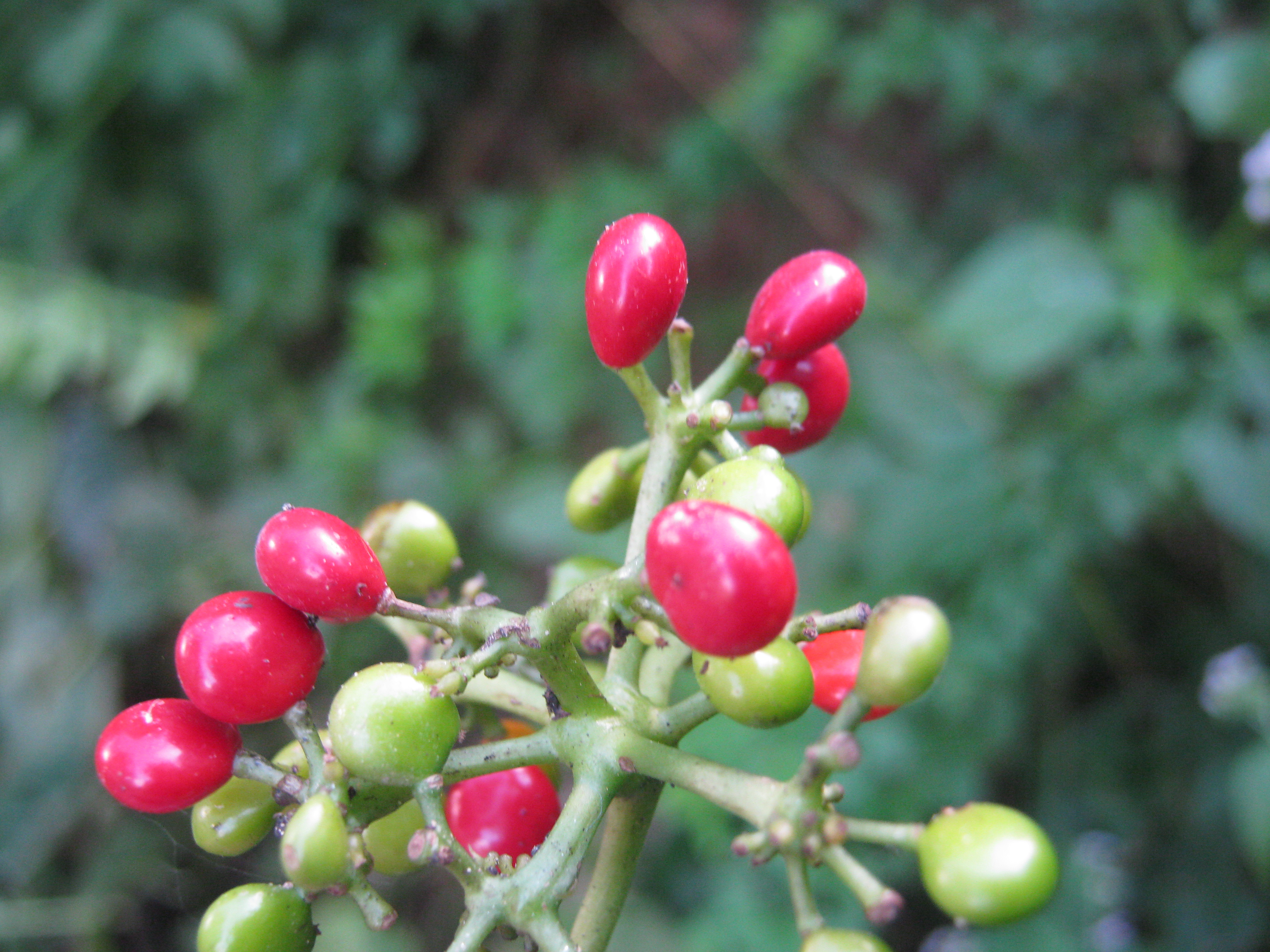
Fruits of Cissampelos pareira during the month of October

Cissampelos pareira (velvetleaf) is a species of flowering plant in the family Menispermaceae.

== Morphology ==
It is a slender tomentose climber. The leaves are peltate, 2.5–12 cm long, 2.5–11.5 cm broad, triangularly broad-ovate, or orbicular, obtuse, mucronate, base cordate or truncate, ± tomentose on both sides; petiole pubescent. Flowers are small in size, pedicels filiform. Male flowers clustered in the axil of a small leaf; sepals are 4 in number, obovate-oblong, hairy outside; petals 4 in number, united to form a 4-toothed cup, hairy outside; stamens 4, column short, anthers connate, encircling the top of the column. Female flowers clustered in the axils of orbicular, hoary imbricate bracts, on 5–10 cm long racemes; sepal 1, petal 1; carpel 1, densely hairy; style shortly 3-fid. Drupes 4–6 mm long, 3–4 mm broad, subglobose, compressed, hairy-pubescent, red when fresh, black when dry, endocarp transversely ribbed, tuberculate. Seeds are horseshoe-shaped.

== Medicinal uses ==
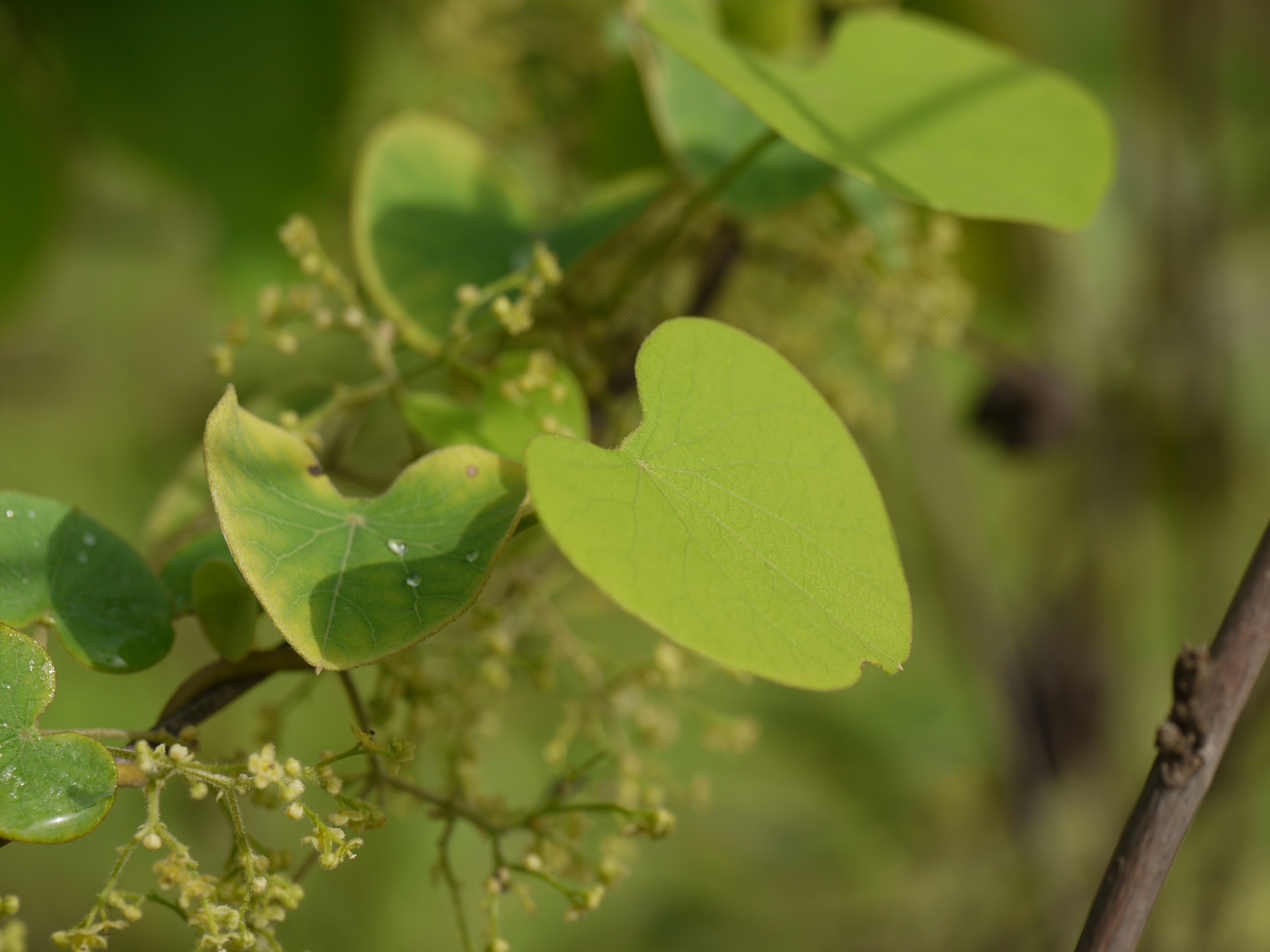
Leaves

Cissampelos pareira is used in Chinese herbology, where it is called xí shēng téng (Chinese: 锡生藤) or yà hū nú (Chinese: 亞乎奴). The species is also known as abuta and called laghu patha in Ayurvedic medicine. In Tamil Nadu it is called ponmusutai and it is used for a number of medicinal purposes.

Some attention has been paid to it in Kenya, Tanzania, and other places for its purported antimalarial properties in particular, as well as in India for its antiviral properties, especially against Dengue virus.

== See also ==
- Chinese herbology
