= Oraesia pierronii =

Scientific classification
- Kingdom: Animalia
- Phylum: Arthropoda
- Clade: Pancrustacea
- Class: Insecta
- Order: Lepidoptera
- Superfamily: Noctuoidea
- Family: Erebidae
- Genus: Oraesia
- Species: O. pierronii

Binomial name
- Oraesia pierronii (Mabille, 1880)

Synonyms
- Odontina pierronii Mabille, 1880; Oraesia cuprea Saalmüller, 1891

Species of moth

Oraesia pierronii is a species of moth of the family Erebidae first described by Paul Mabille in 1880. It is found on Madagascar and Réunion.

The wingspan of the male is 44 mm.
