= Wolframmeyia imperialis =

Scientific classification
- Kingdom: Animalia
- Phylum: Arthropoda
- Clade: Pancrustacea
- Class: Insecta
- Order: Lepidoptera
- Superfamily: Noctuoidea
- Family: Erebidae
- Subfamily: Calpinae
- Genus: Wolframmeyia
- Species: W. imperialis

Binomial name
- Wolframmeyia imperialis (Grünberg, 1910)

Synonyms
- Calpe imperialis Grünberg, 1910; Calyptra imperialis (Grünberg, 1910)

Species of moth

Wolframmeyia imperialis is a species of moth of the family Erebidae. The scientific name of this species was first published in 1910 by Karl Grünberg. It is found in the Democratic Republic of the Congo.
