= Coeloconica =

Sensory organs in various insects

Coeloconica are a type of sensory organ found in various insects, including mosquitoes, ants, and centipedes. They are typically cone-shaped structures with a pore at the tip, and they are believed to function as chemoreceptors, detecting chemicals in the environment.

In mosquitoes, coeloconica are located on the antennae and are thought to be involved in detecting host odors, such as carbon dioxide and lactic acid. In ants, they are found on the antennae and the maxillae, and they may be involved in detecting pheromones and other chemical cues. In centipedes, they are found on the maxillipeds, which are the first pair of appendages behind the head, and they may be involved in detecting prey and predators.

The exact function of coeloconica is not fully understood, but they are thought to play an important role in the behavior and ecology of many insects.
