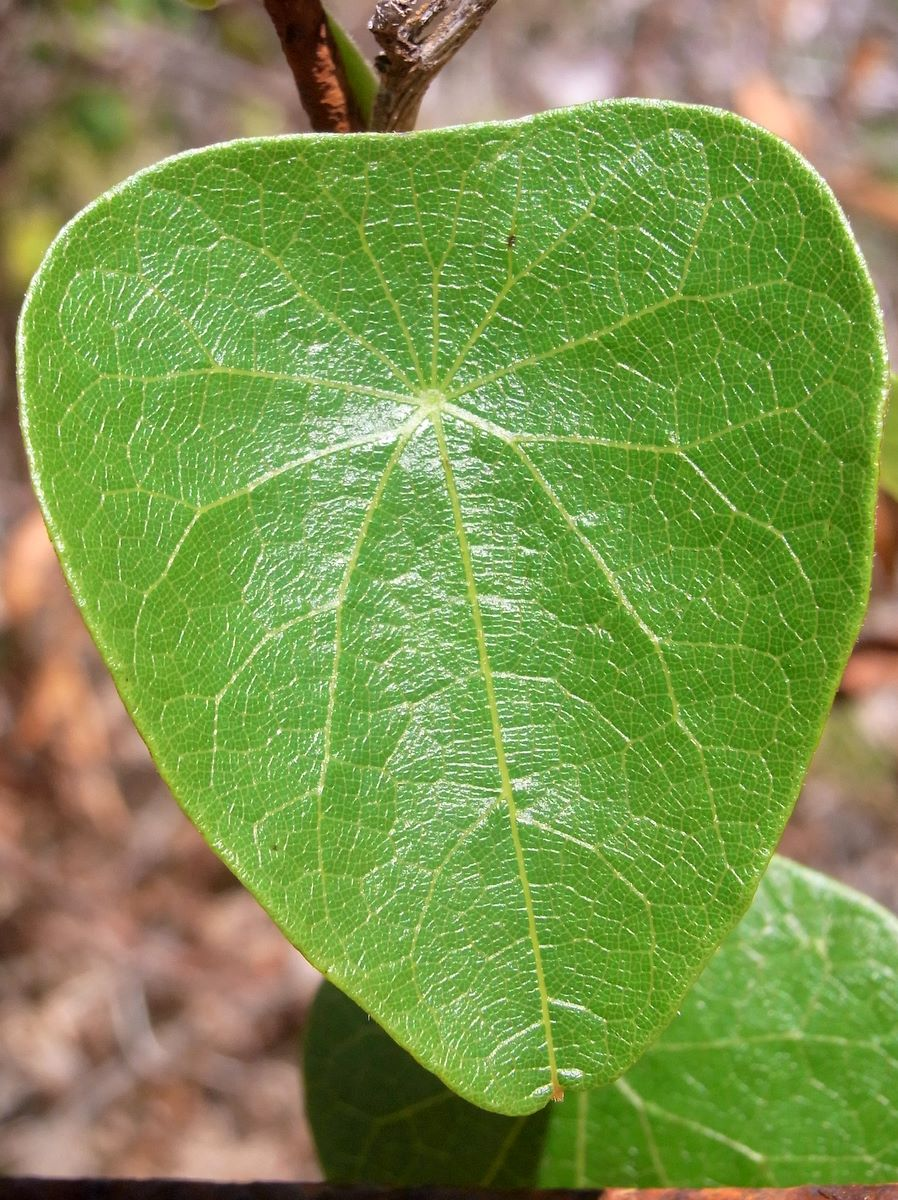
- Snake vine at Palm Beach, Australia

Scientific classification
- Kingdom: Plantae
- Clade: Embryophytes
- Clade: Tracheophytes
- Clade: Spermatophytes
- Clade: Angiosperms
- Clade: Eudicots
- Order: Ranunculales
- Family: Menispermaceae
- Genus: Stephania
- Species: S. japonica

Binomial name
- Stephania japonica (Thunb.) Miers

Synonyms
- Stephania hernandiifolia (Willd.) Walp., 1922

= Stephania japonica =

Snake vine

Species of plant

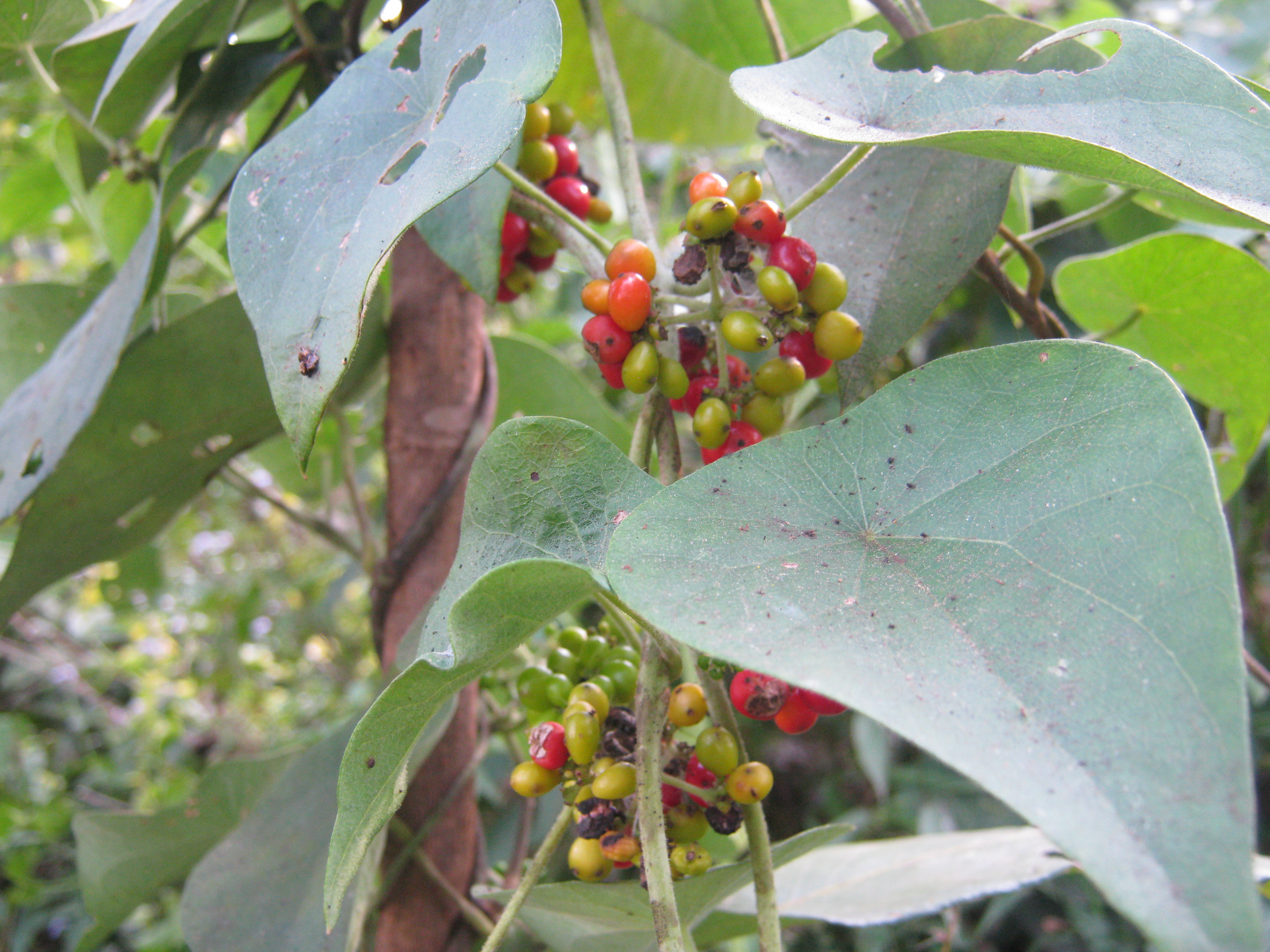
S. japonica (Batuli Pate) in Panchkhal valley, Nepal

Stephania japonica, known as snake vine, is a vine often seen in sheltered areas near the sea.

== Description ==
A dioecious vine without prickles. Greenish small flowers form on compound umbels, growing from the leaf axils in the warmer months. Inflorescences are 4 to 8 cm long. The fruit is an oval shaped, orange or red drupe, 2 to 5 mm long. A feature of this plant is the peltate leaves, (the stem is attached to the leaf, away from the leaf edge).

== Distribution ==
In Australia, it is widespread vine seen as far south as Eden, New South Wales and north through Queensland. It is also found in Japan, India, Nepal, and many other areas of south-east Asia and the Pacific region. The original specimen was collected in Japan, hence the specific epithet “japonica”. The variety in New South Wales is known as bicolor, as the under-side of the leaf is somewhat paler than above.

== Chemistry ==
Protostephanine is an alkaloid collected from Stephania japonica. Antihypertensive agent.

== Consumption ==
The leaves of this plant are commonly used to produce edible green grass jelly in Indonesia.
