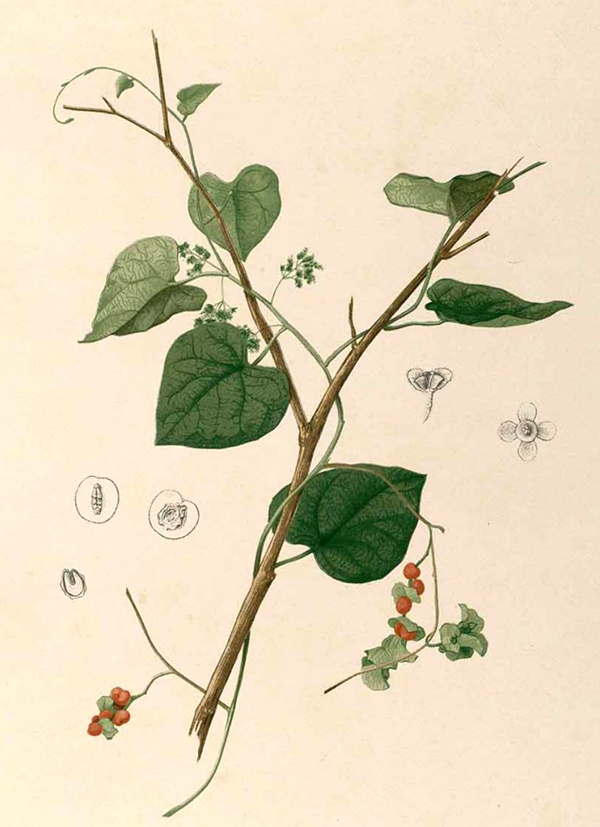
- Cissampelos pareira illustration.

Scientific classification
- Kingdom: Plantae
- Clade: Tracheophytes
- Clade: Angiosperms
- Clade: Eudicots
- Order: Ranunculales
- Family: Menispermaceae
- Genus: Cissampelos; L.

Species
- 19, including: Cissampelos capensis Cissampelos pareira Cissampelos sympodialis

= Cissampelos =

Genus of flowering plants

Cissampelos is a genus of flowering plants in the family Menispermaceae. Various species of this genus have a history of use in various traditions of herbal medicine. Moreover, many of these plants were used as curare applied as arrow poison during hunting.

Cissampelos pareira is used in Chinese herbology. The species is also known as abuta in Ayurvedic medicine. The Maasai people of Kenya use Cissampelos mucronata as a forage for their cattle.

== Selected species ==
21 accepted species + 1 newly discovered species

- Cissampelos andromorpha DC.
- Cissampelos arenicola Ortiz RdC, MH Nee. 2014 New species
- Cissampelos capensis L.f.
- Cissampelos fasciculata Benth.
- Cissampelos friesiorum Diels
- Cissampelos glaberrima A.St.-Hil.
- Cissampelos grandifolia Triana & Planch.
- Cissampelos hirta Klotzsch
- Cissampelos hispida Forman
- Cissampelos laxiflora Moldenke
- Cissampelos mucronata A.Rich.
- Cissampelos nepalensis Rhodes
- Cissampelos nigrescens Diels
- Cissampelos ovalifolia DC.
- Cissampelos owariensis P.Beauv. ex DC.
- Cissampelos pareira L.
- Cissampelos rigidifolia (Engl.) Diels
- Cissampelos sympodialis Eichler
- Cissampelos tenuipes Engl.
- Cissampelos torulosa E.Mey. ex Harv. & Sond.
- Cissampelos tropaeolifolia DC.
- Cissampelos verticillata Rhodes
