= Chè =

Type of Vietnamese dessert

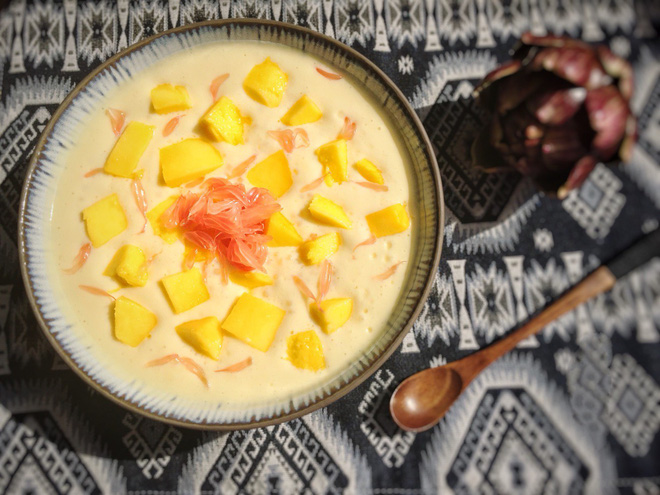
- Bowl of chè xoài, a variety of chè made from mango
- Type: Soup or pudding
- Course: Dessert
- Place of origin: Vietnam
- Region or state: Regions of Vietnam
- Serving temperature: Cold, hot or warm

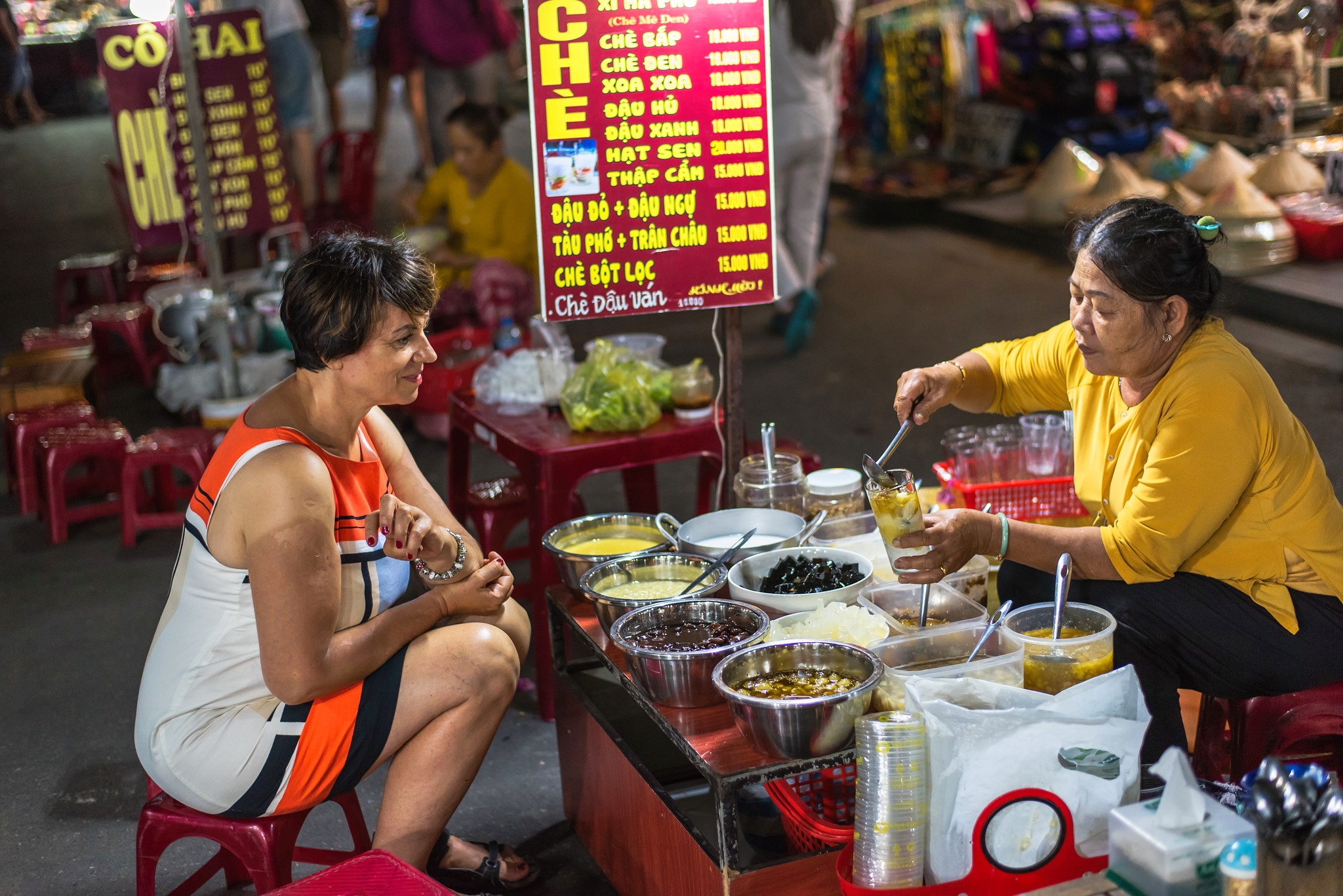
A woman selling chè in Hội An

Chè (Vietnamese pronunciation: [tɕɛ̀]~[cɛ̀]) in traditional Vietnamese cuisine refers to a wide variety of distinct sweet beverages, puddings and desserts. Varieties of Chè can be made with mung beans, black-eyed peas, kidney beans, tapioca, jelly (clear or grass), fruit (longan, mango, durian, lychee or jackfruit), and coconut cream. Other types are made with ingredients such as salt, aloe vera, seaweed, lotus seed, sesame seed, sugar palm seeds, taro, cassava and pandan leaf extract. Some varieties, such as chè trôi nước, may also include dumplings. Chè are often prepared with one of a number of varieties of beans, tubers, and/or glutinous rice, cooked in water and sweetened with sugar. In southern Vietnam, chè are often garnished with coconut creme.

Chè may be served either hot or cold, and eaten with a bowl and spoon or drunk in a glass. Each variety of chè is designated by a descriptive word or phrase that follows the word chè, such as chè đậu đỏ (literally "red bean chè").

Chè may be made at home, but are also commonly sold in plastic cups at Vietnamese grocery stores.

In northern Vietnam, chè is also the word for the tea plant. Tea is also known as nước chè in the North or more commonly trà in both regions.

== Varieties ==
There is a nearly endless variety of named dishes with the prefix chè, and thus it is impossible to produce a complete list. What follows is a list of the most typical traditional varieties of chè.

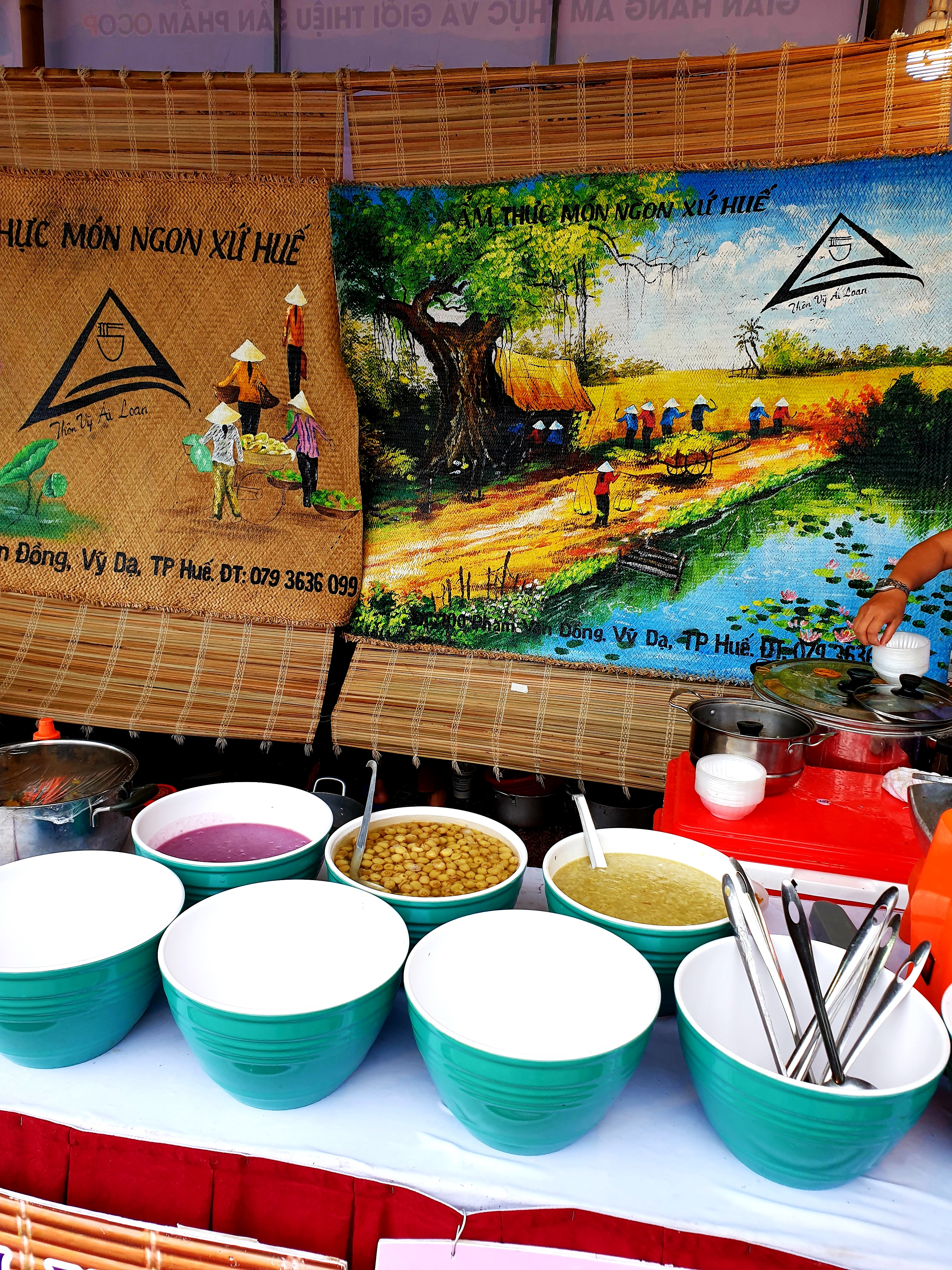
Some chè dishes at Cửa Việt culinary festival

=== Beans and pulses ===
- Chè đậu đen - made from black turtle beans; one of the most popular varieties of chè, particularly for northern Vietnamese
- Chè đậu đỏ - made from azuki beans, usually using whole beans, rarely using ground beans.
- Chè đậu huyết - made from red beans.
- Chè đậu ngự - made from Phaseolus lunatus (or moon beans) - specialty in Huế, an imperial dish
- Chè đậu phụng (or chè lạc) - made from peanuts
- Chè đậu trắng - made from black-eyed peas. Oftentimes, this dessert is just referred to as chè đậu as it is one of the most common bean dessert for southern Vietnamese.
- Chè đậu ván - made from Dolichos lablab (hyacinth beans); a specialty in Huế
- Chè đậu xanh - made from whole mung beans
  - Chè đậu xanh rong biển - made from mung beans and kelp
  - Chè đậu xanh đánh' - made from ground mung beans
  - Chè đậu đãi - made from ground skinless mung beans (đãi means to remove the skin)
  - Chè hoa cau - a northern dish made from ground skinless mung beans with betel nut flower-shape (or chè táo xọn, uses less mung beans)

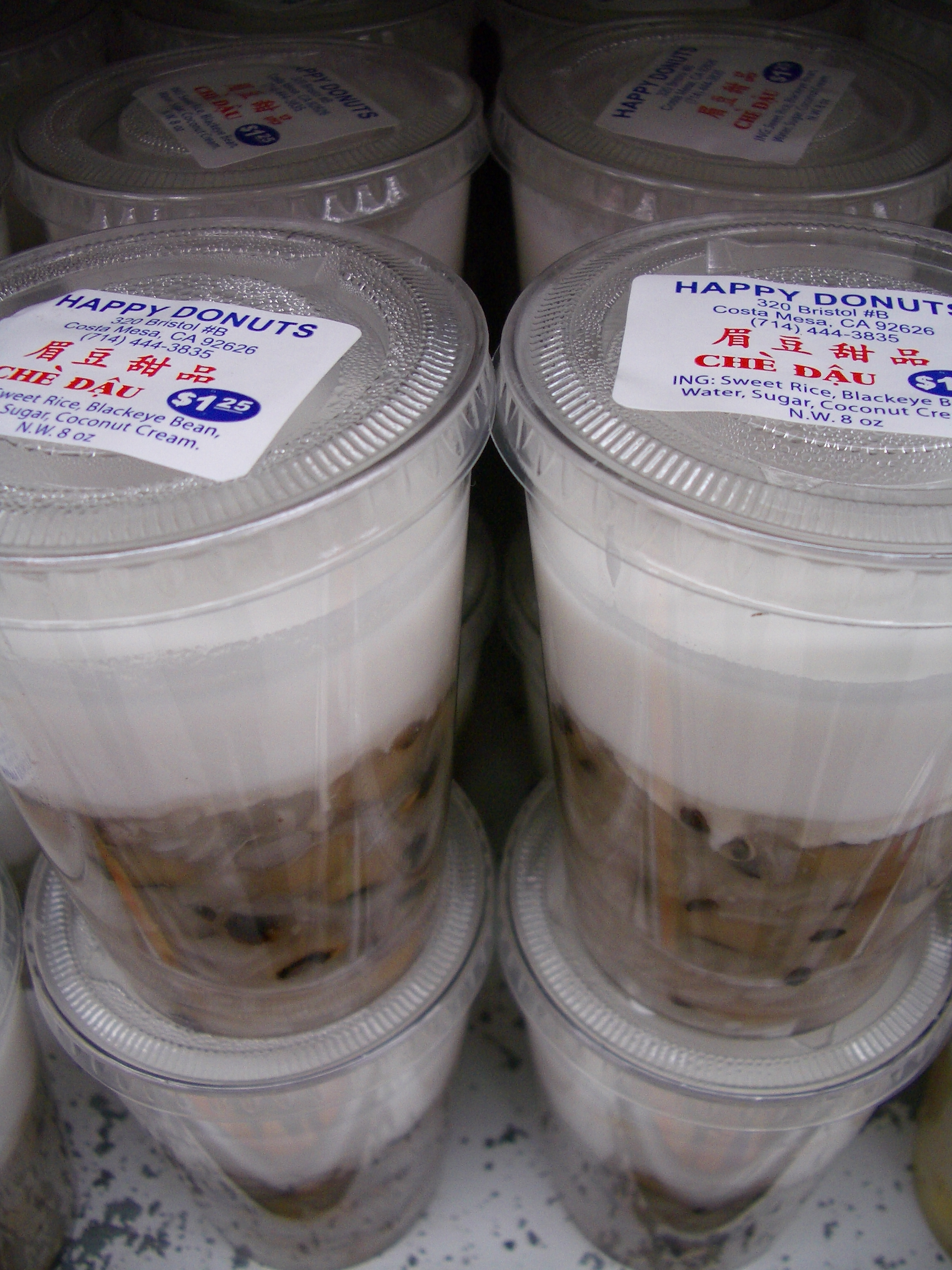
Plastic containers of chè đậu trắng, a variety of chè made from black-eyed peas, in an Asian grocery store

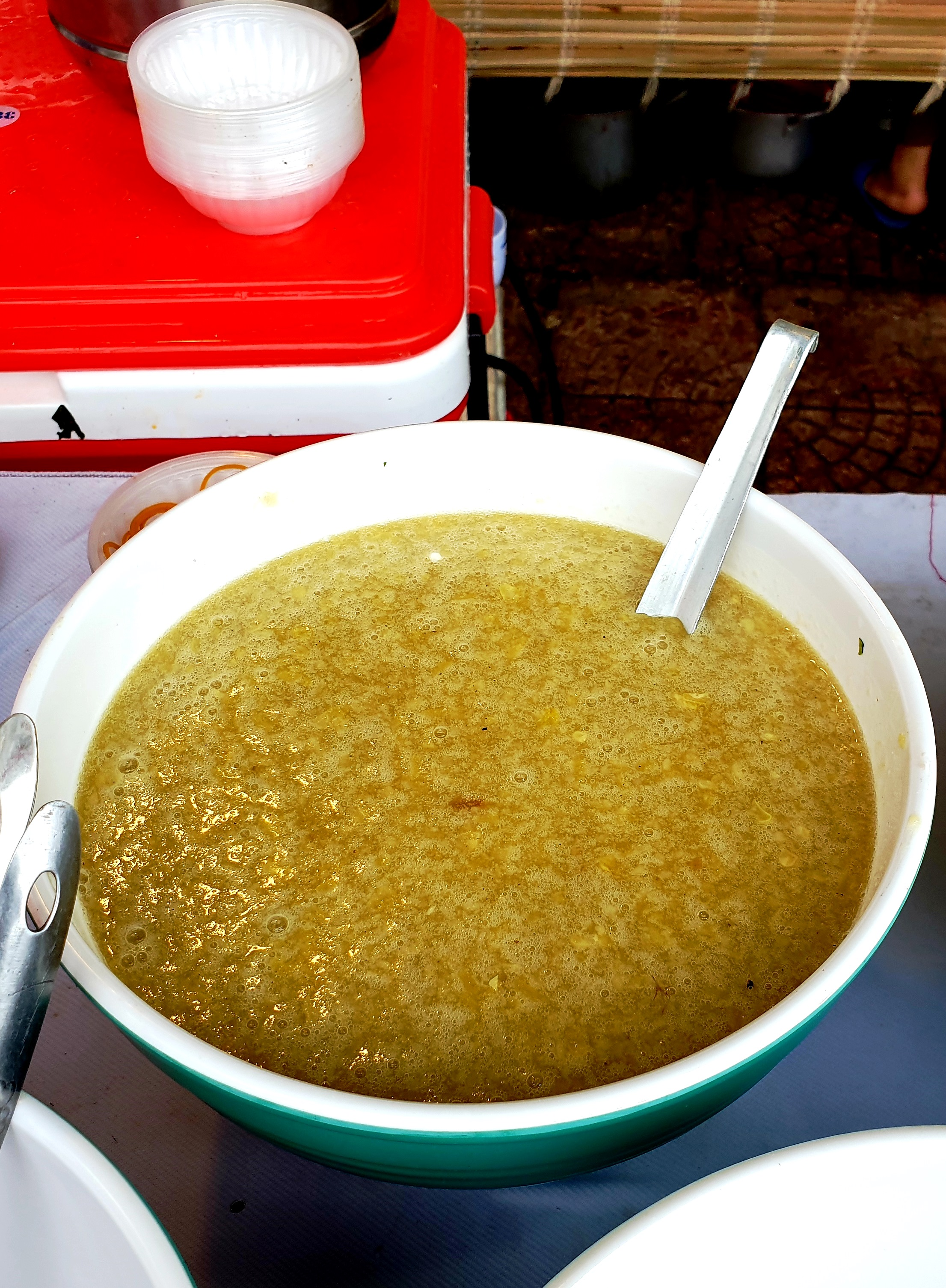
Chè đậu xanh đánh

=== Rice, grains, tubers and cereals ===
- Chè bánh lọt - made from bánh lọt - a cake from Huế (lọt means "to sift").
- Chè bắp (or chè ngô) - made from corn seeds and tapioca rice pudding
- Chè bí đỏ - made from pumpkin
- Chè cốm - made from young rice
- Chè củ năng (or chè mã thầy) - made from water chestnuts
- Chè củ súng - made from water lily bulbs
- Chè hạt lựu - in this dish, rice paste are cut into pomegranate seed-shaped pieces.
- Chè hạt sen - made from lotus seeds
  - Chè sen dừa' - made from lotus seeds and coconut water
  - Chè củ sen - made from lotus tubers
- Chè kê - made from millet
- Chè khoai lang - made from sweet potato
- Chè khoai mài (or chè củ mài) - made from Dioscorea persimilis
- Chè khoai mì (or chè sắn) - made from cassava flour
  - Chè sắn lát - made from sliced cassava
- Chè khoai môn - made from taro
  - Chè môn sáp vàng - made from a variety of taro grown in Huế
- Chè khoai mỡ (or chè khoai tía) - made from Dioscorea alata
- Chè khoai tây - made from potato
- Chè khoai từ (or chè củ từ) - made from Dioscorea esculenta
- Chè mè đen - made from black sesame seeds
- Chè sen - made from thin vermicelli and jasmine flavoured syrup

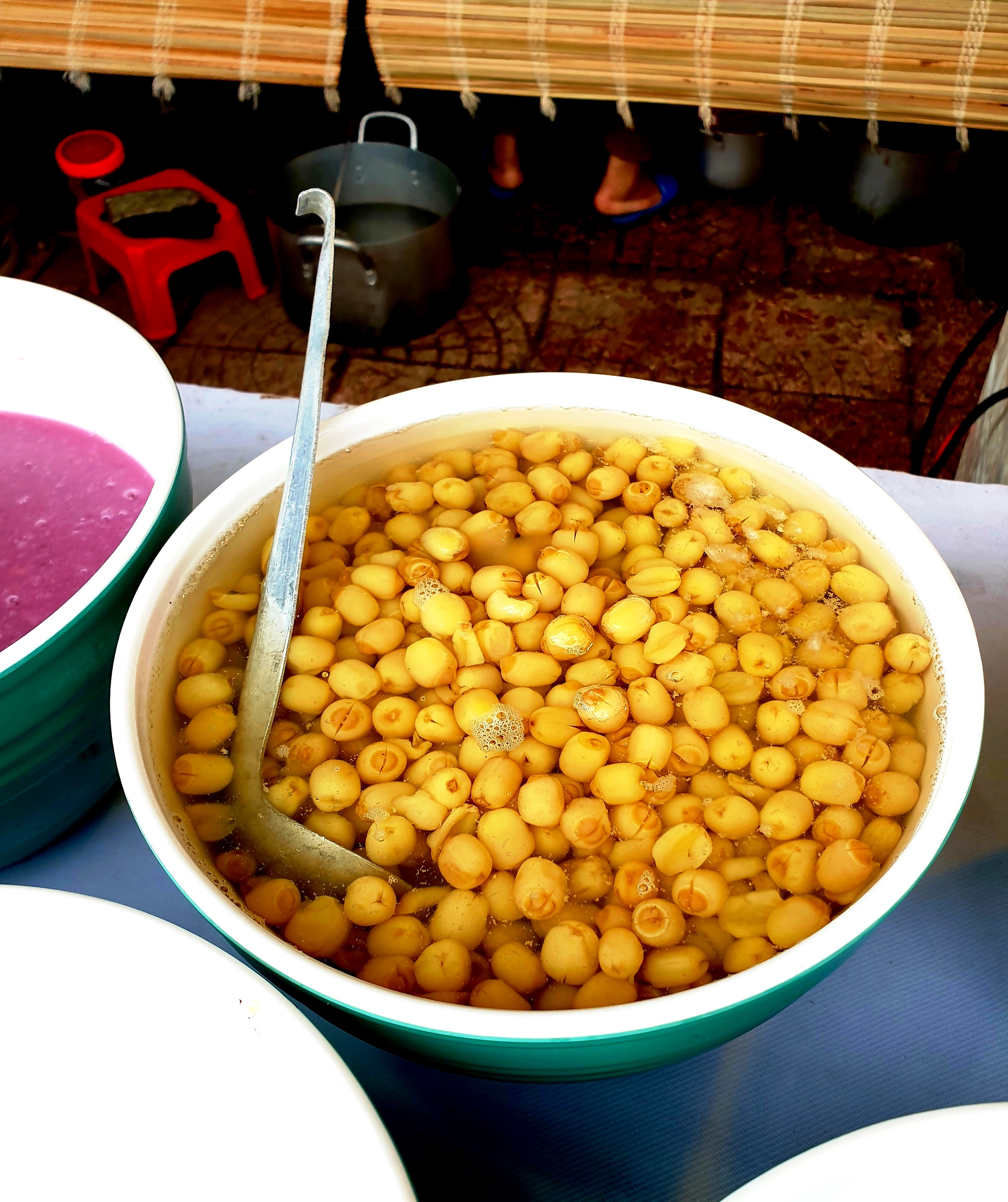
Chè hạt sen

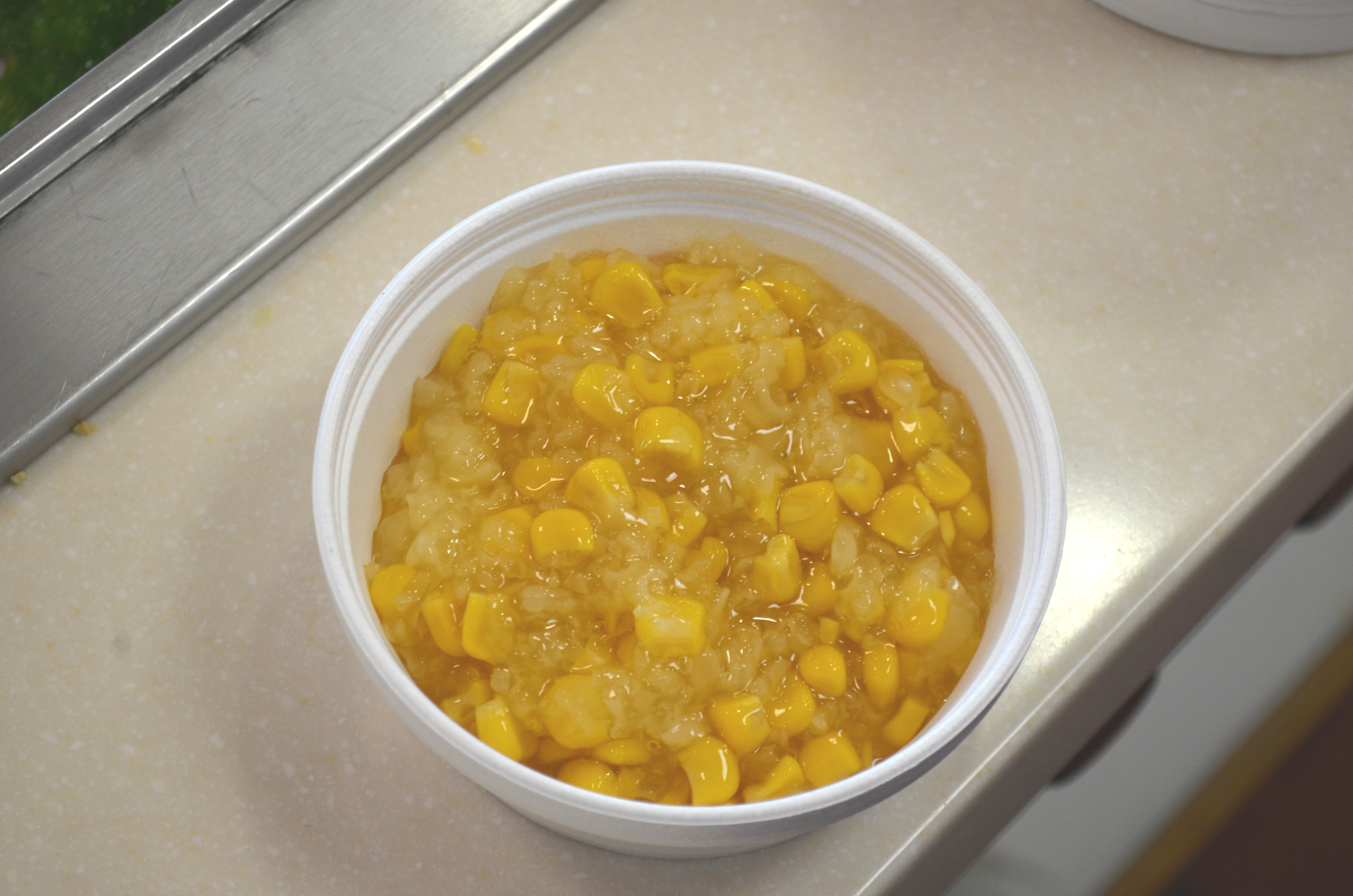
A bowl of chè bắp

=== Jellies ===
- Chè thạch or chè rau câu - made from agar agar
  - Chè thạch lựu - made from seaweed and other pomegranate seed-shaped tapioca pearls.
  - Chè thạch sen - made from seaweed and lotus seeds
- Sương sâm - jelly with Tiliacora triandra extract
- Sương sáo - Grass jelly
- Chè thạch sen - thin, vermicelli-like jellies.

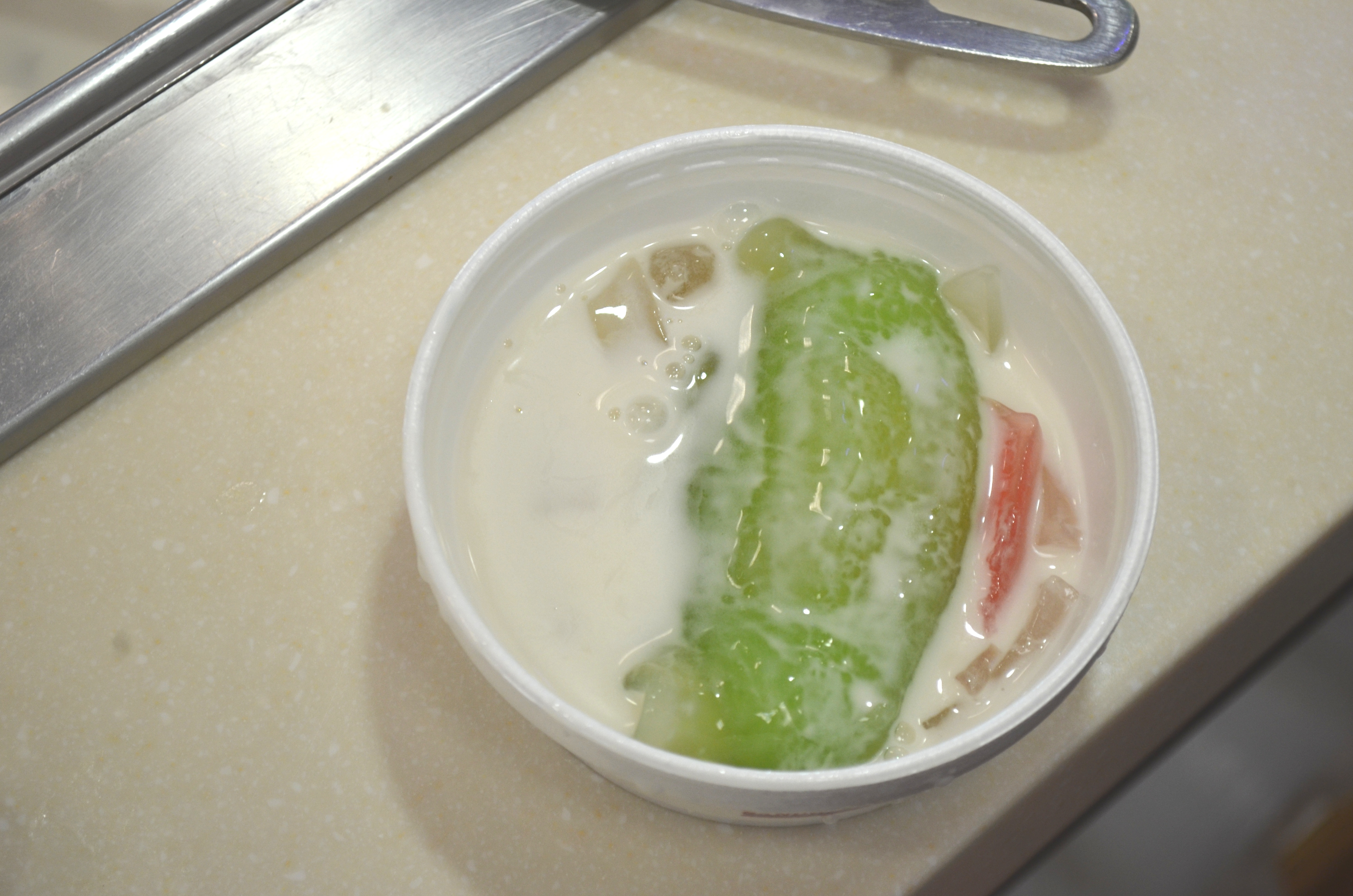
Chè bánh xếp

=== Dumplings ===
- Chè bột lọc from small cassava and rice flour dumplings
- Chè con ong (lit. 'bee sweet soup'; so named because this dish is viscous and yellow, like honey) - made from glutinous rice, ginger root, honey, and molasses– this is a northern dish, usually cooked to offer to the ancestors at Tết.
- Chè bánh xếp - green beans wrapped in a tapioca skin dumpling, eaten in a coconut milk base with smaller pieces of tapioca. Translated to English, the dish is "folded cake dessert".
- Chè trôi nước or Bánh chay - balls made from mung bean paste in a shell made of glutinous rice flour; served in a thick clear or brown liquid made of water, sugar, and grated ginger root.

=== Fruits and plants ===
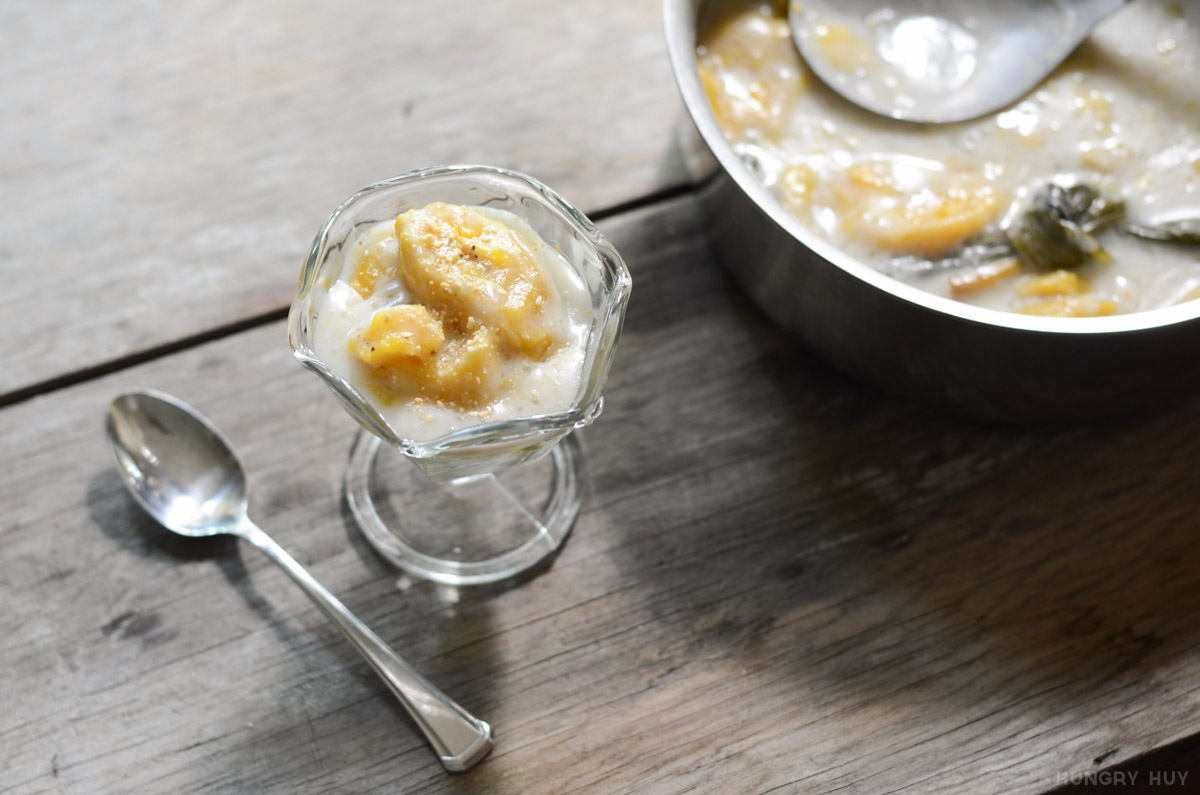
A cup of chè chuối

- Chè chuối - made from bananas and tapioca (Vietnamese: bột báng or bột năng). Traditionally served warm.
- Chè dưa hấu - made from watermelon
- Chè nhãn - made from longan
- Chè xoài - made from mango
- Chè bưởi - made from pomelo oil and slivered rind
- Chè sầu riêng - made from durian

=== Mixed ===
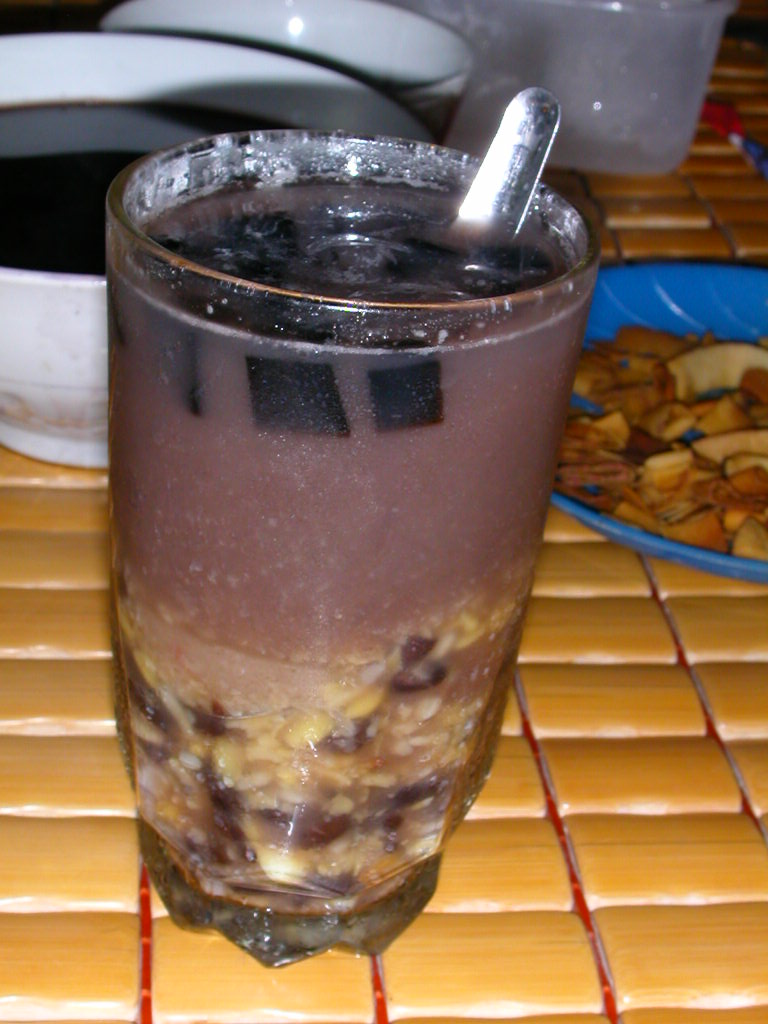
A cup of chè thập cẩm

- Chè ba màu (lit. 'three colours chè') - usually including green mung beans, white black-eyed peas, and red azuki beans, although people can cook with any ingredients making any three colours they like (compare with halo halo).
- Chè đậu đỏ bánh lọt - red beans and bánh lọt.
- Chè thập cẩm (chè lẫn) meaning ten-ingredient sweet soup or mixed sweet soup is a mixture of various kinds of ingredients such as black-eyed peas, azuki beans, lotus seeds, mung beans, coconut, syrup, ice cream, milk and trân châu. This is one of the most popular forms of chè served in Vietnam.
- Chè trái cây (or chè hoa quả) - mixture of different fruits including pineapple, watermelon, apple, pear, mango, lychee, dried banana, cherry, and dried coconut with milk, yogurt, and syrup
- Chè bà ba - made from taro, cassava and khoai lang bí, a kind of long sweet potato, with red skin and yellow flesh.
- Chè bà cốt - made from expanded glutinous rice
- Chè thưng - name translates to combo dessert in Vietnamese. One version is made from dried red jujube, peanut, and dried Auricularia auricula-judae fungus, while another is made from taro, cassava, green bean, sea weed, and water chestnuts

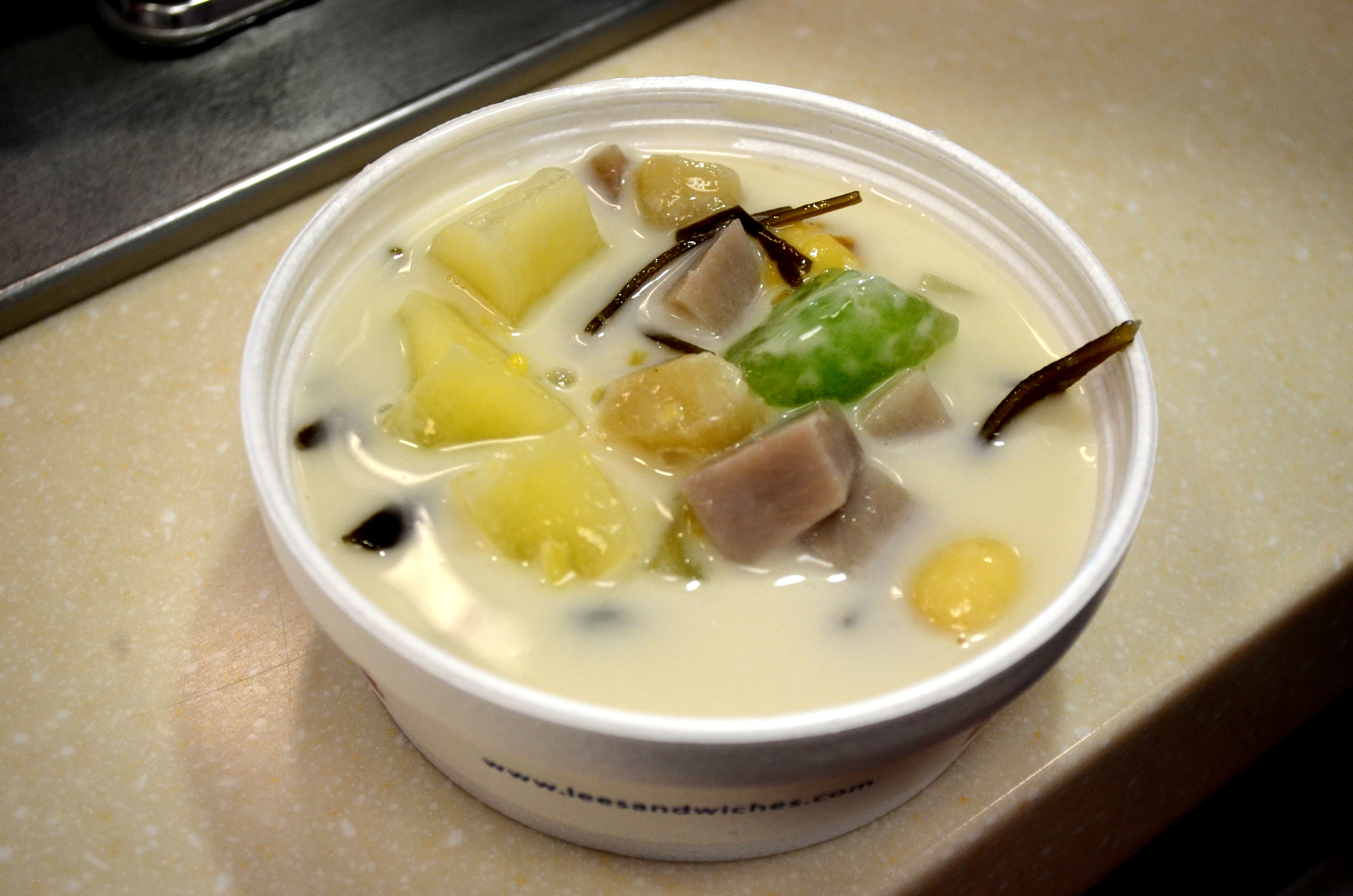
One version of the chè thưng

=== Savory chè (chè mặn) ===
- Chè lạp xường - made from Chinese sausage
- Chè trứng đỏ - made from eggs and other ingredients
- Chè trứng - served with boiled eggs, either hot or cold, in a sweet soup base or sweet tea
- Chè bột lọc heo quay - made from bánh bột lọc filled with roasted pork
- Chè cá rô đồng - made from climbing perch

=== Foreign chè ===
- Bubur cha cha or Bocha - a Vietnamese interpretation of a popular sweet soup originating from Malaysia and Singapore, found in Hanoi.
- Chè Thái - a sweet fruit soup, which is believed to be a version of Thailand's tub tim krob, but the Vietnamese version uses a variety of tropical fruits, while the Thai version uses strictly water chestnuts.

== Gallery ==
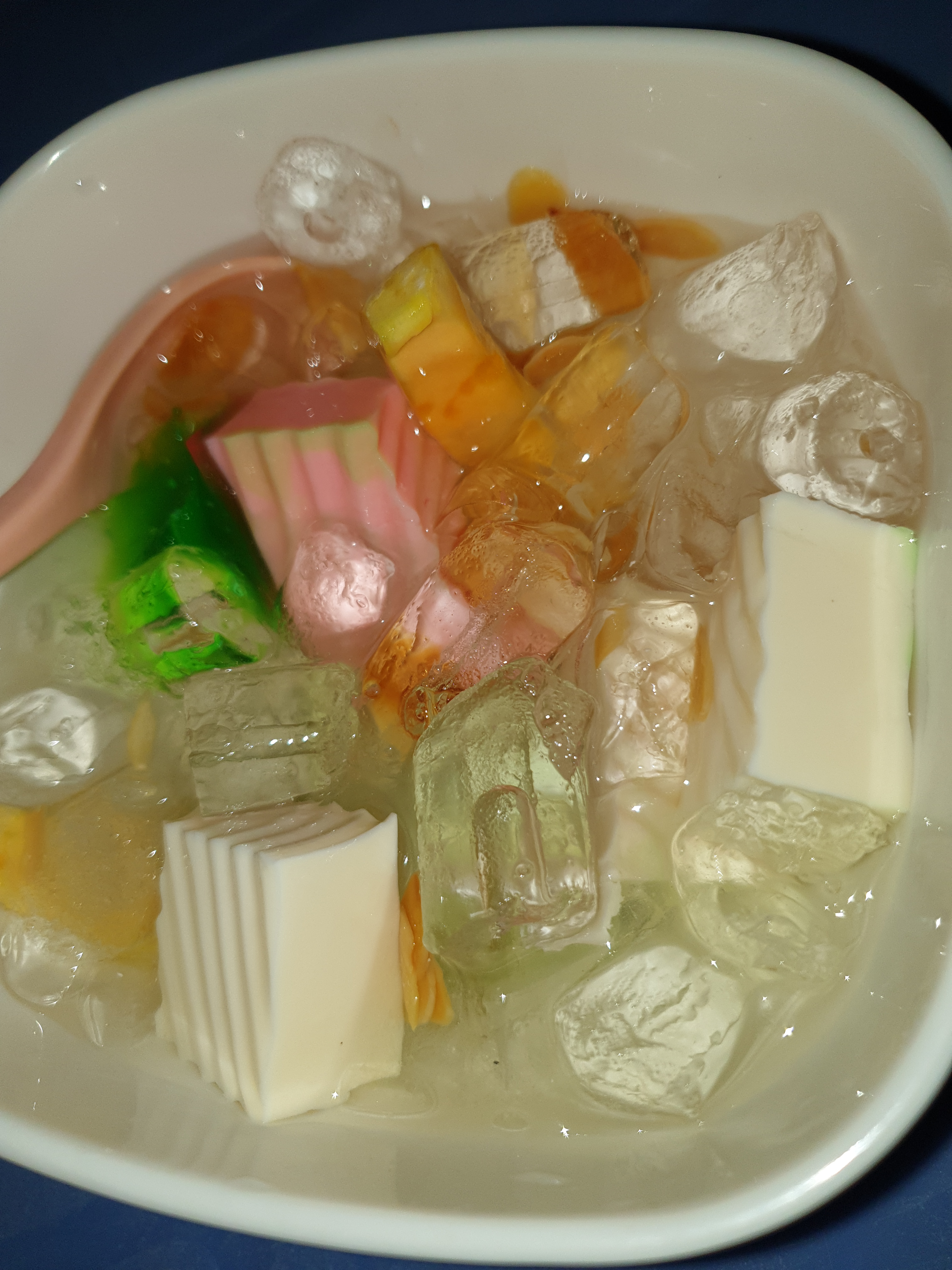
Chè khúc bạch

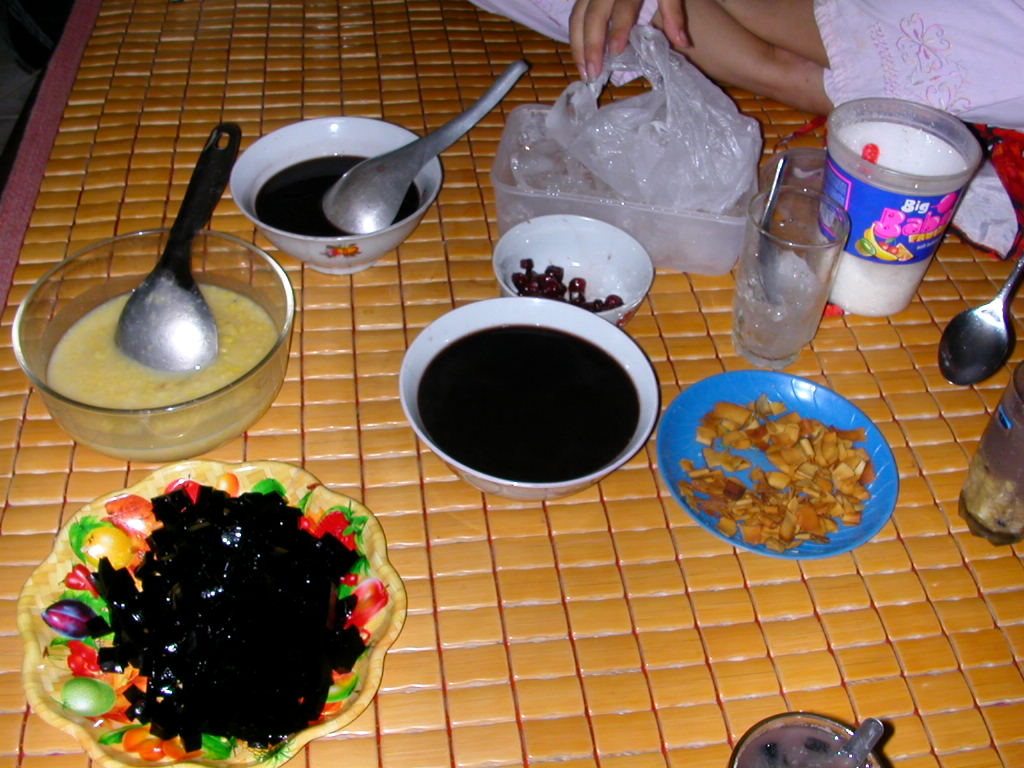
Some ingredients to make a bowl of chè thập cẩm

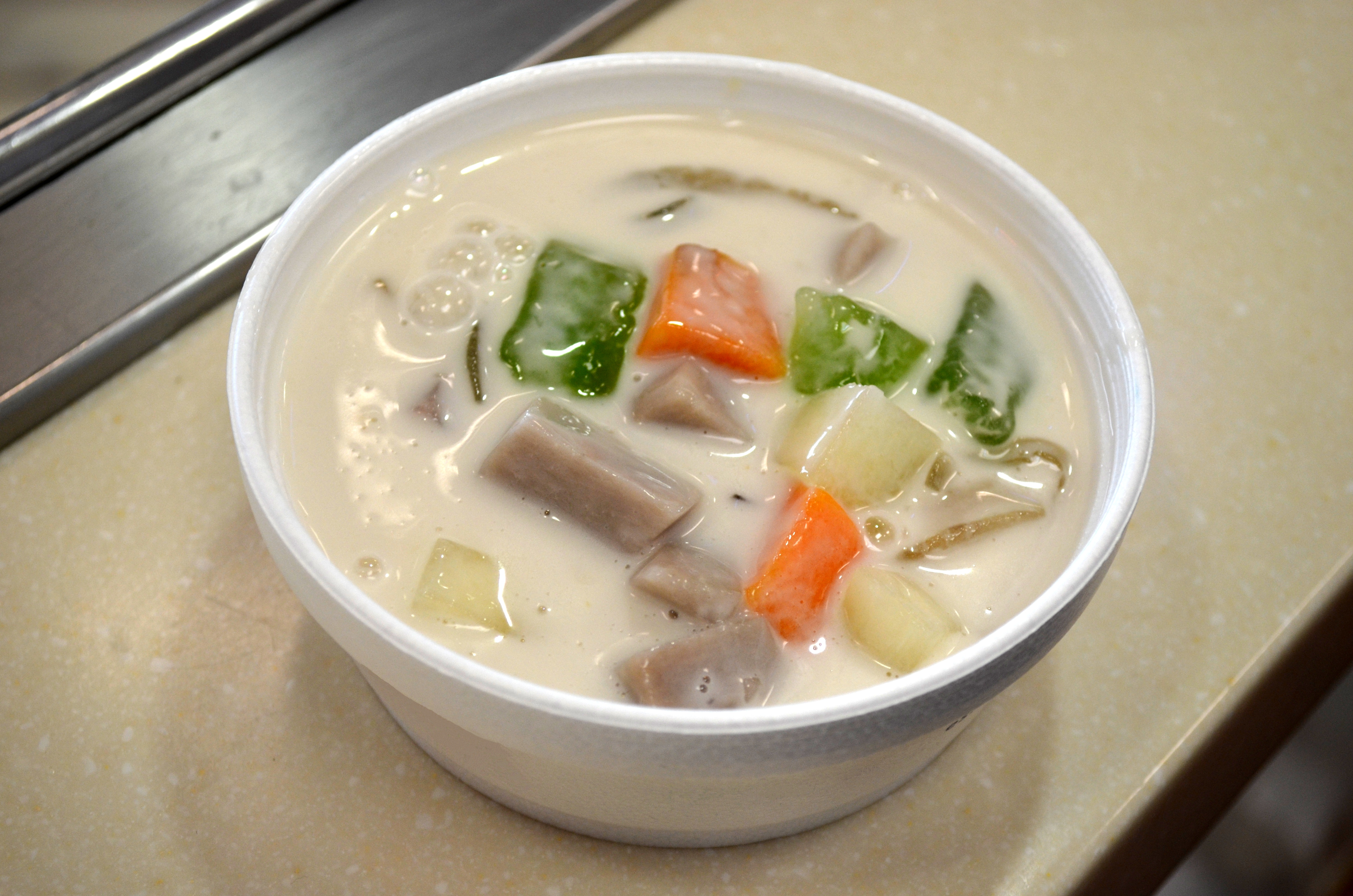
Chè bà ba

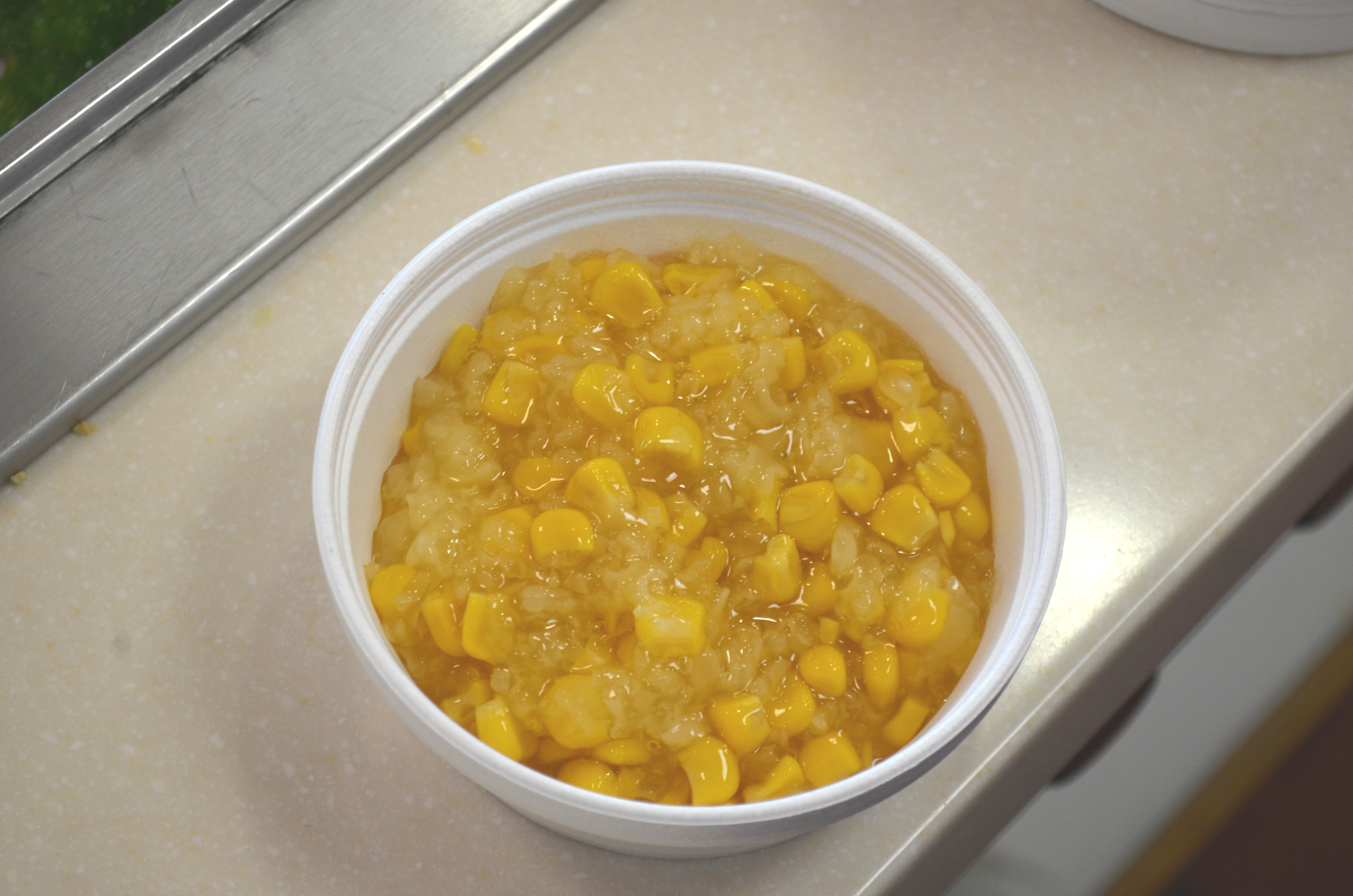
Chè bắp

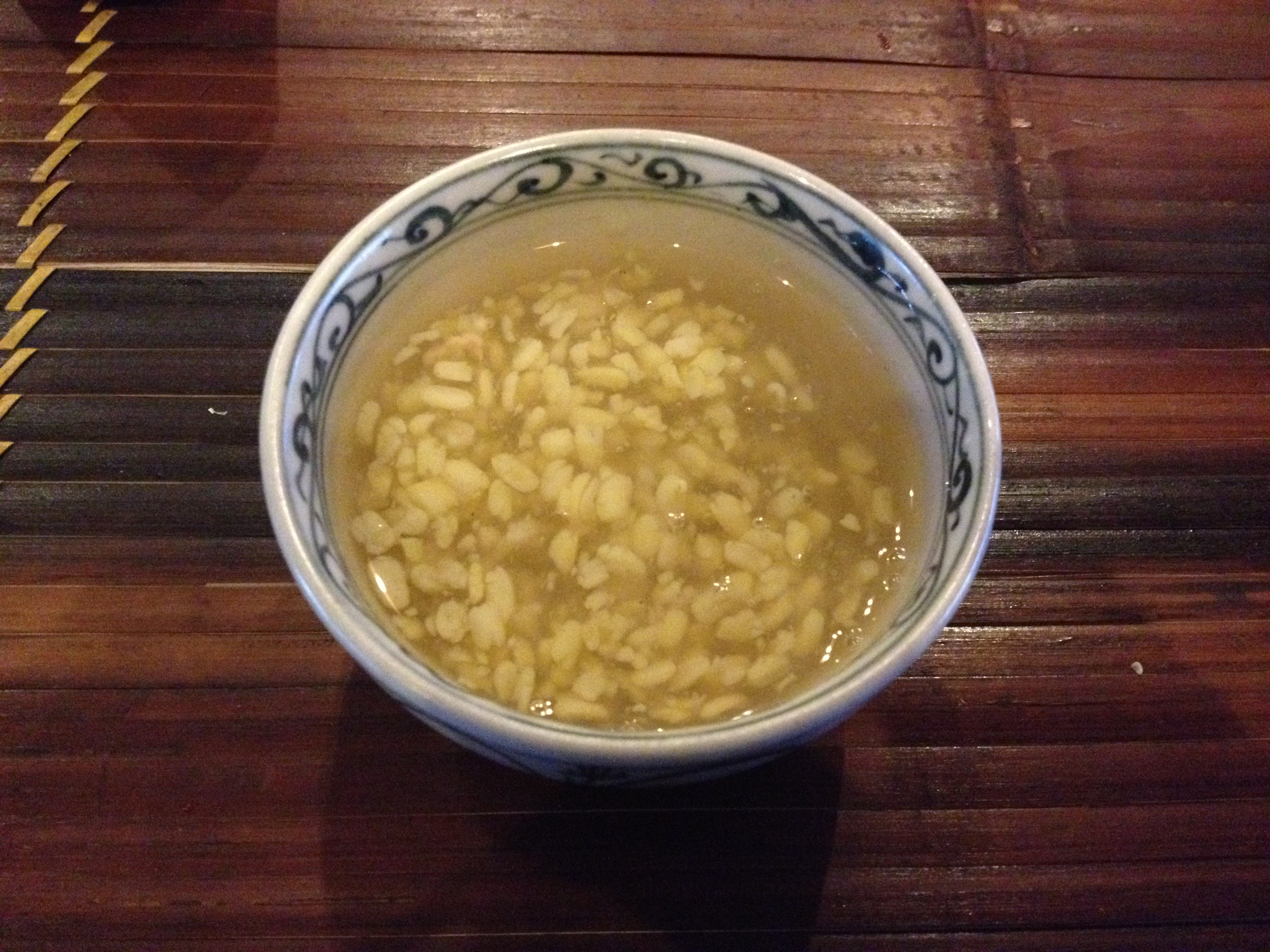
Chè đỗ xanh

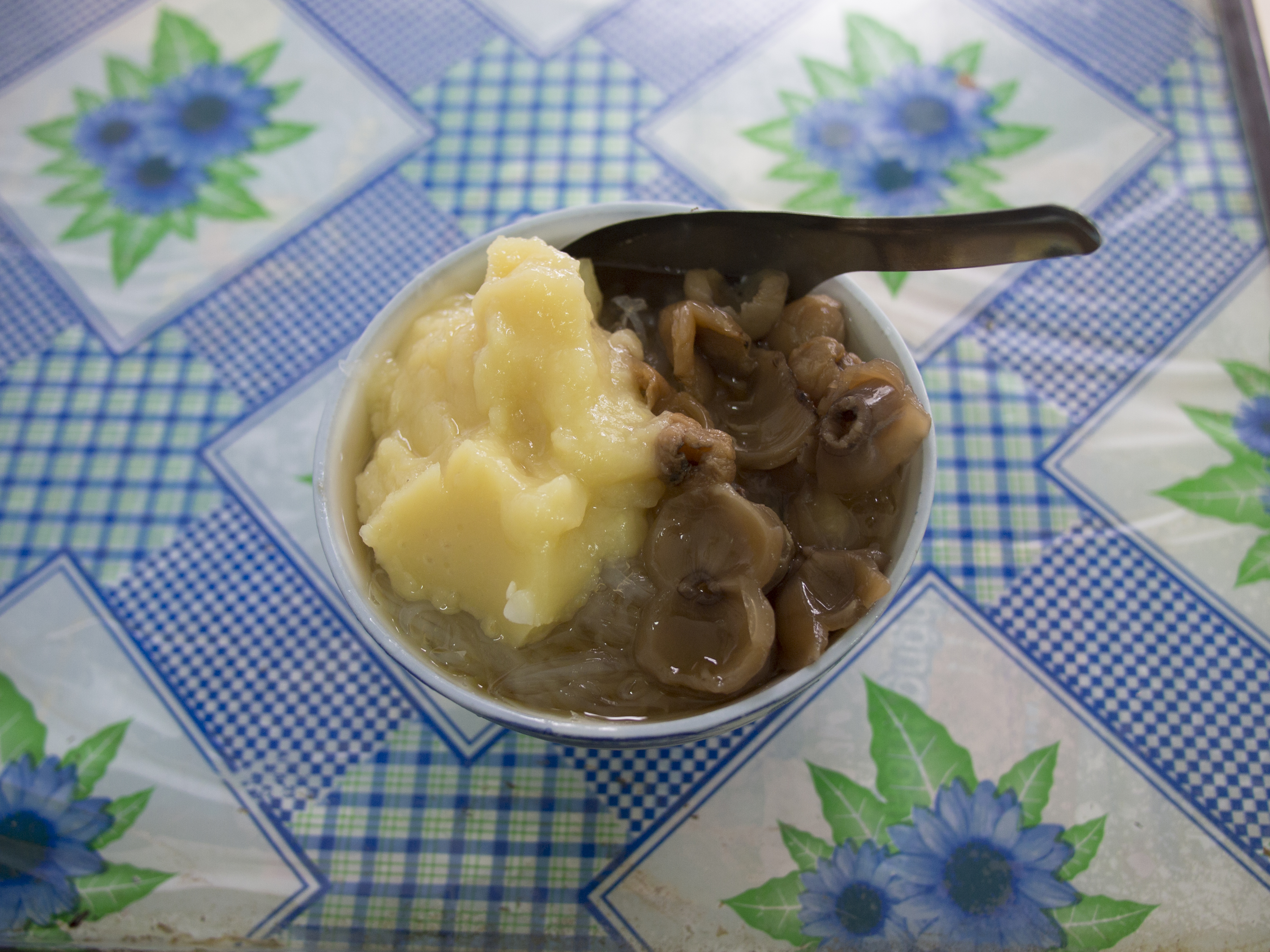
Chè Thạch Trắng Đậu Xanh Nhãn Nhục

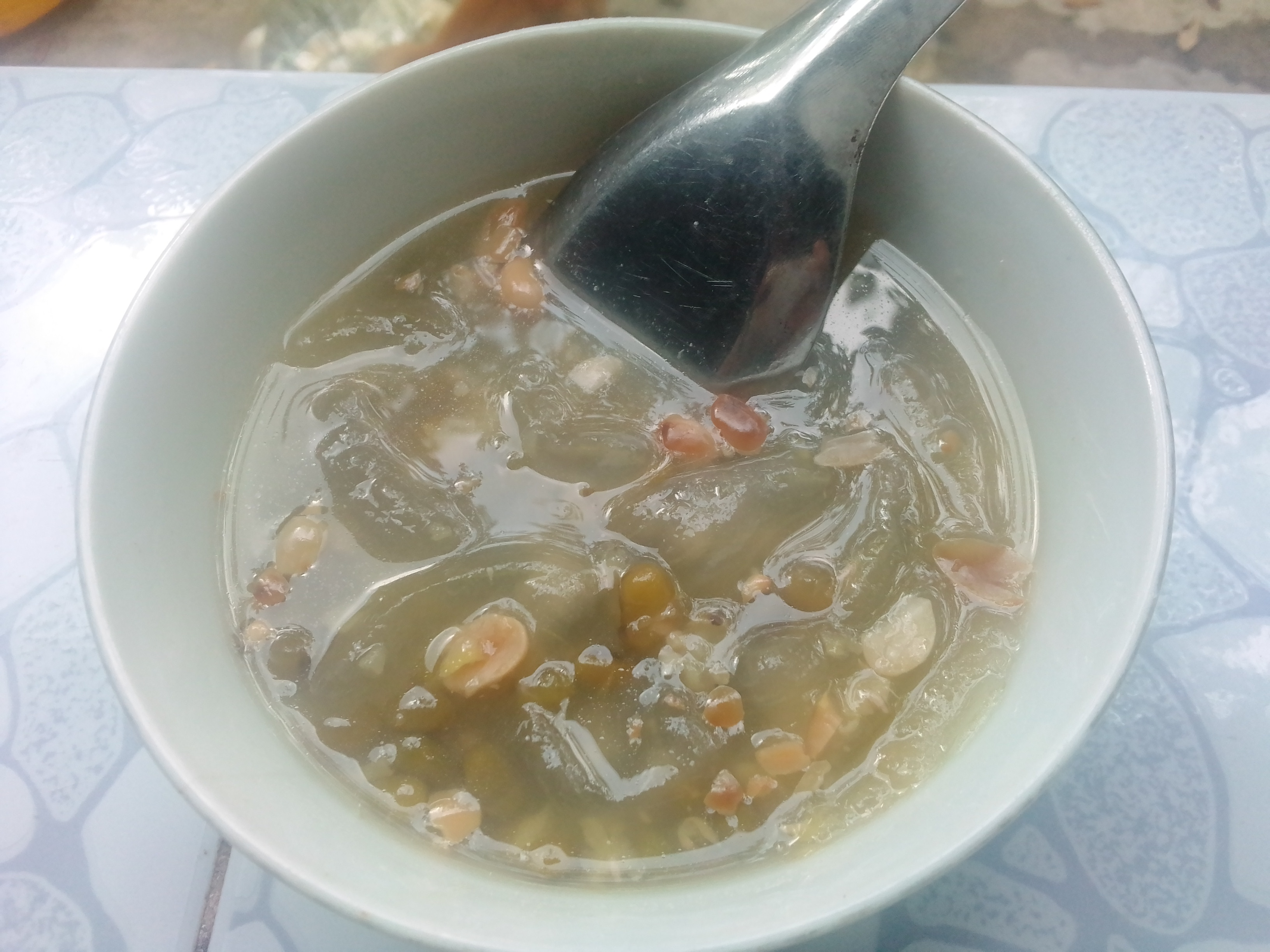
Chè đậu xanh nha đam

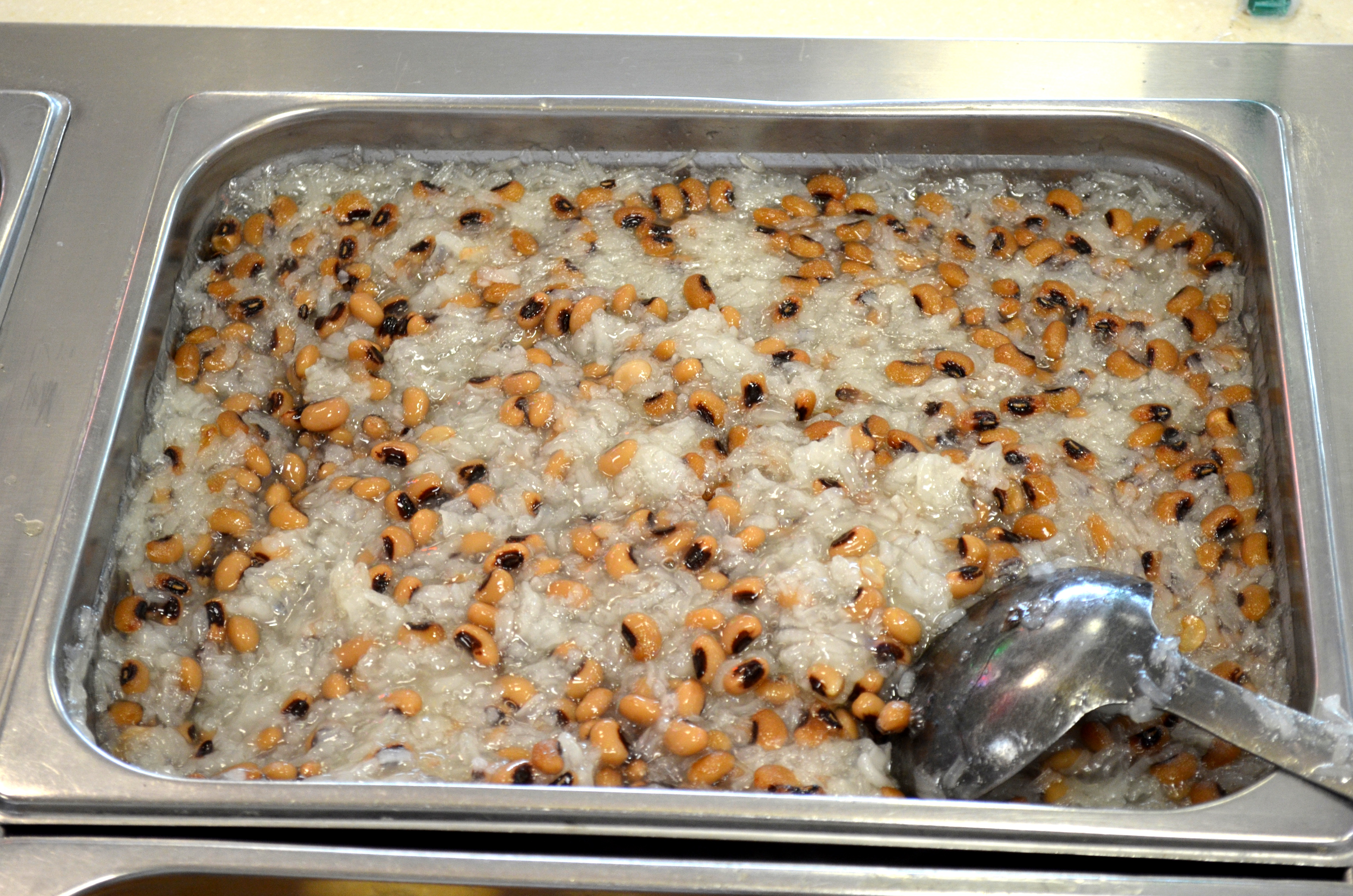
Chè đậu trắng

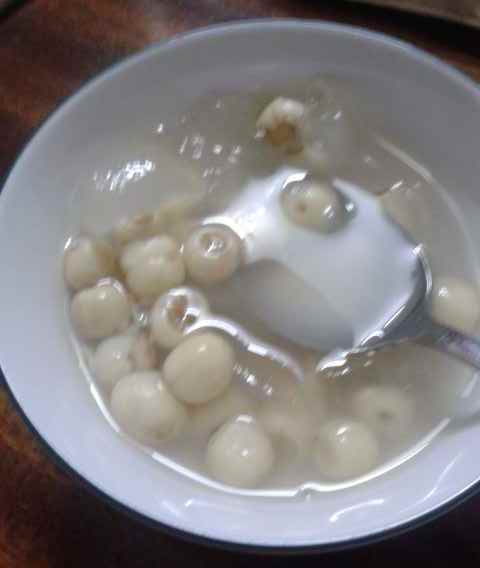
Chè hạt sen

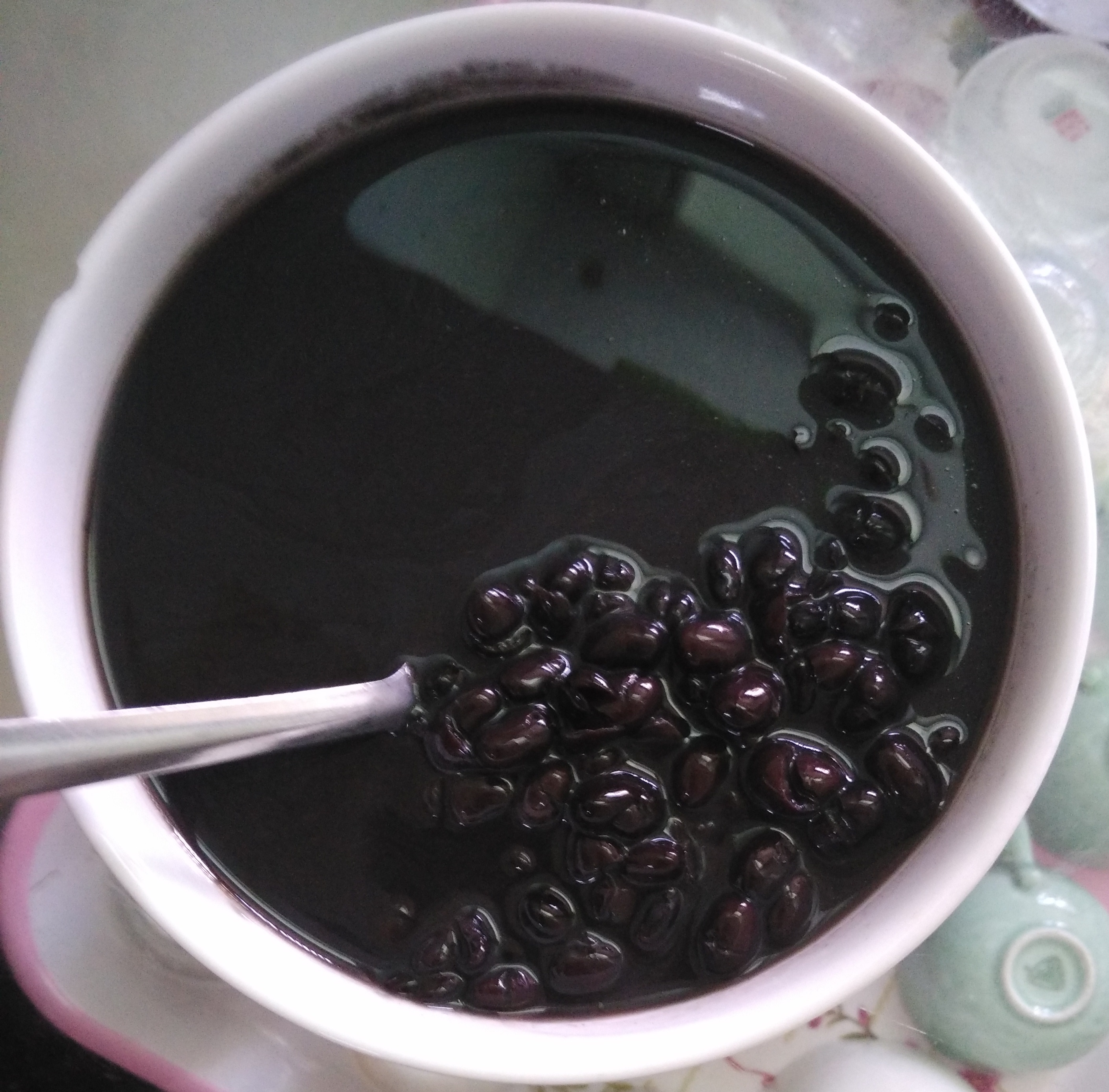
Chè đậu đen

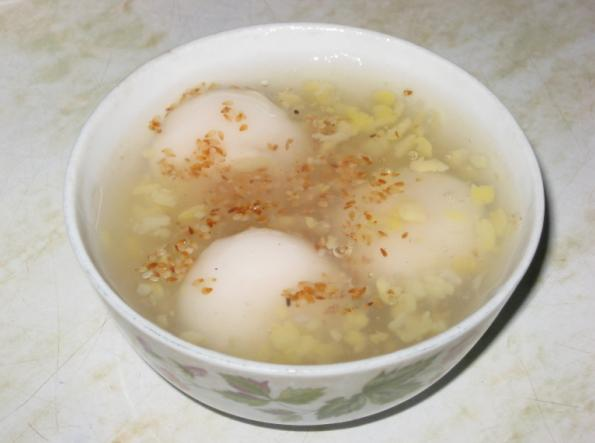
A bowl of Bánh chay

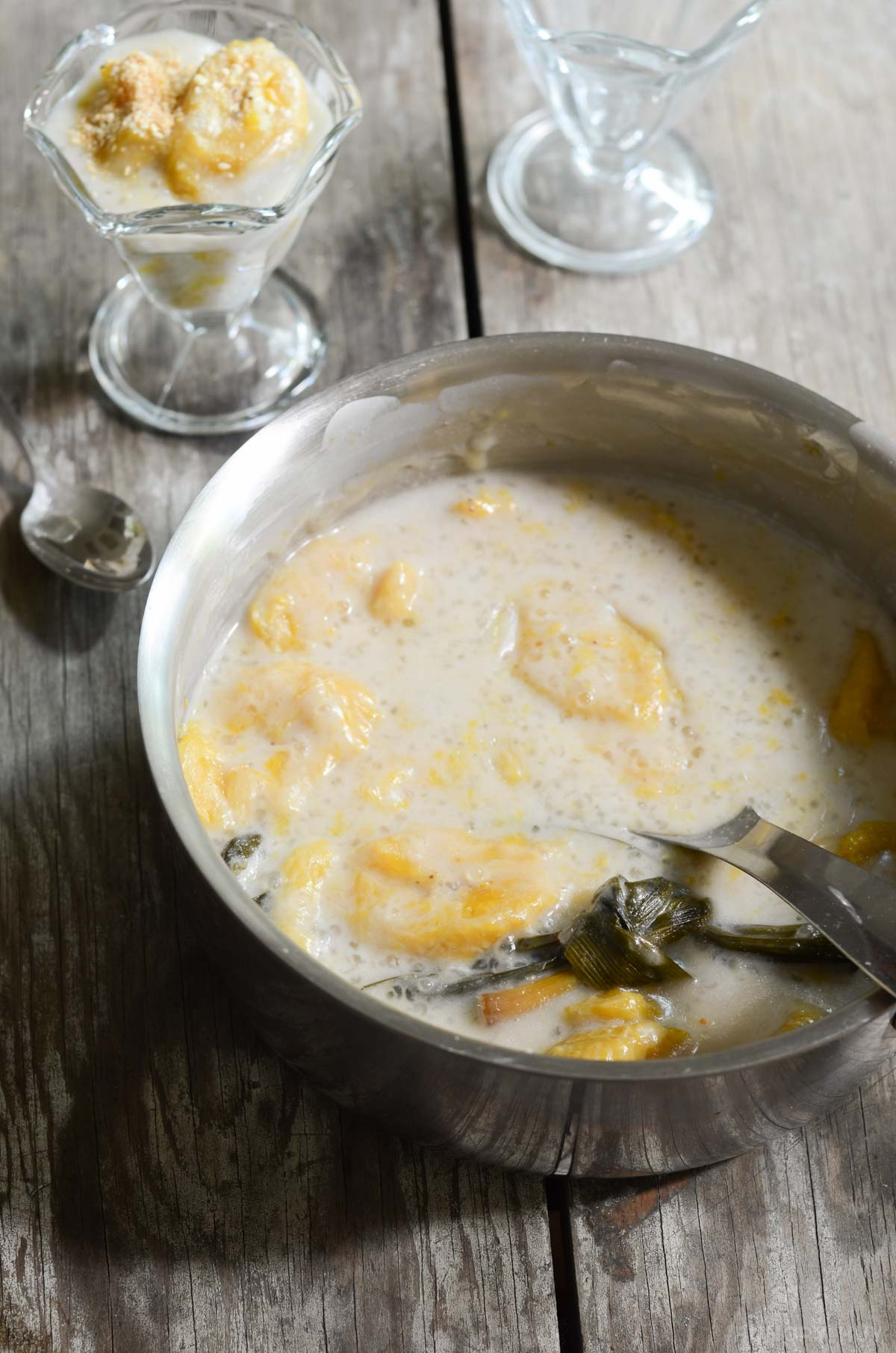
Chè chuối

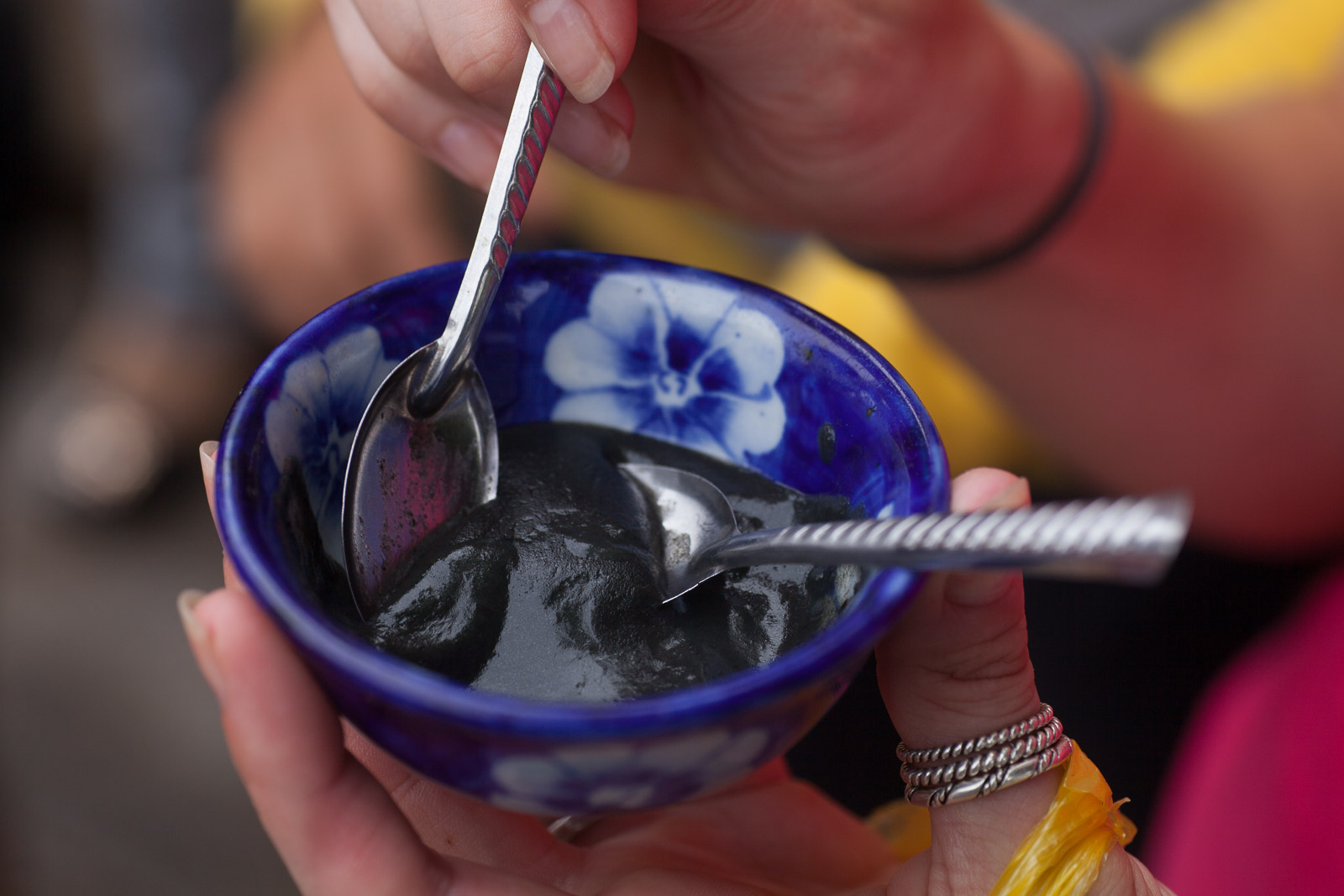
Chè xí má

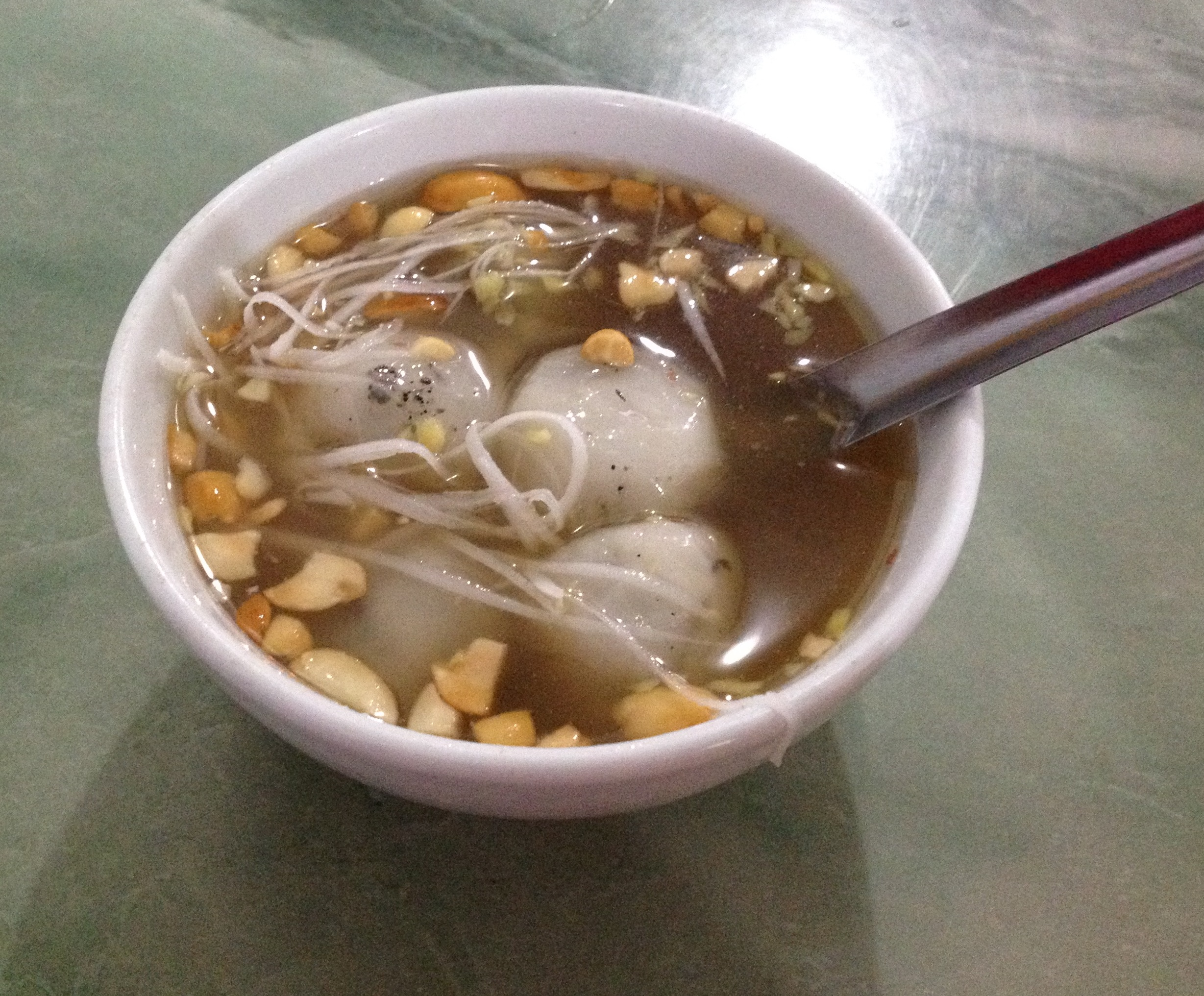
Sủi dĩn

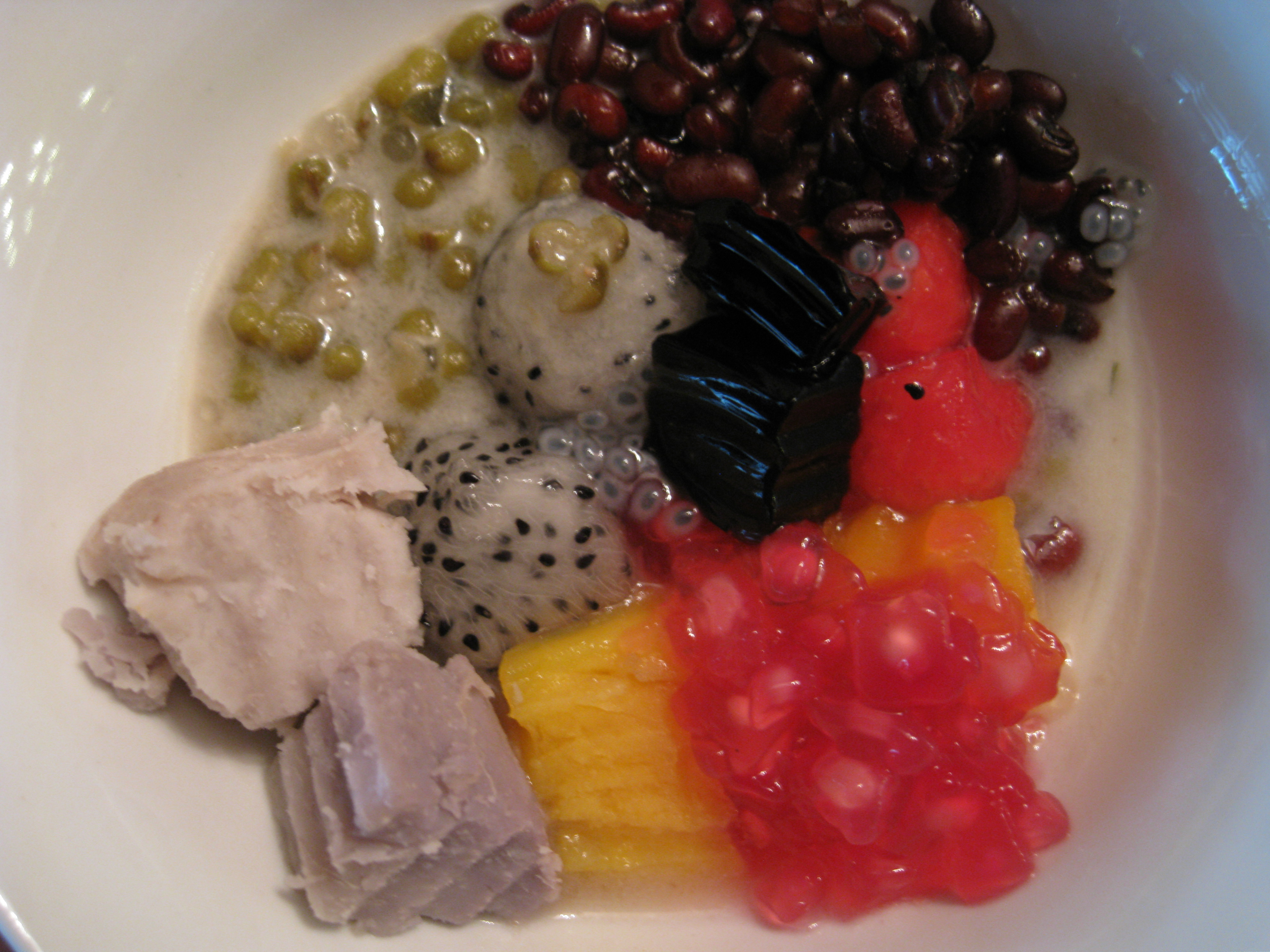
Chè hoa quả

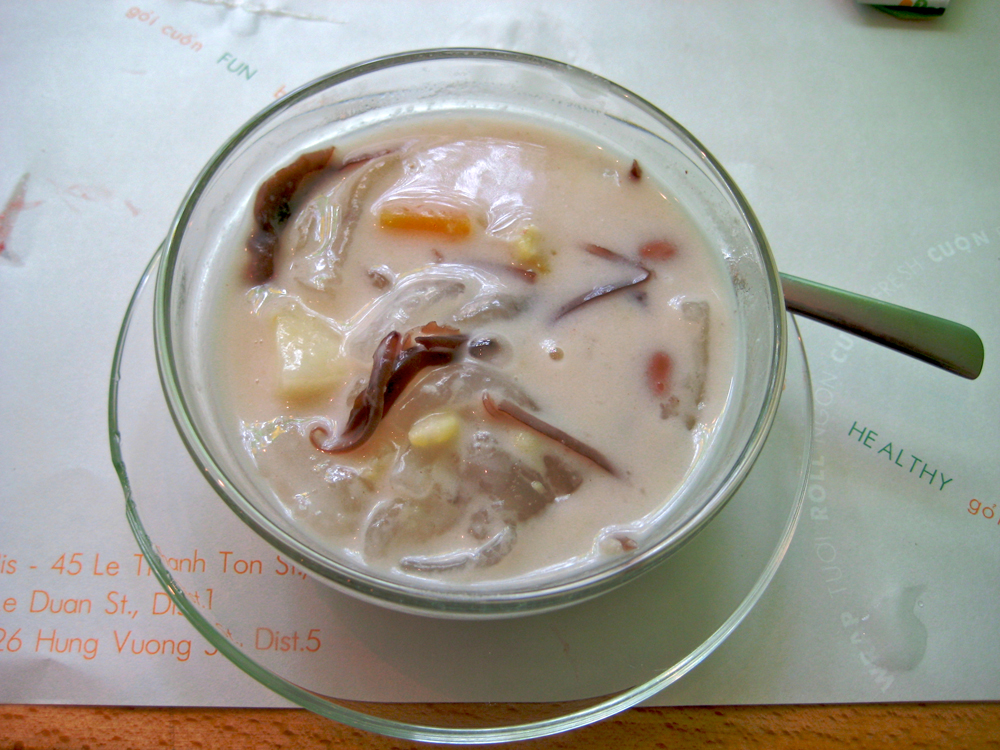
Chè khoai môn

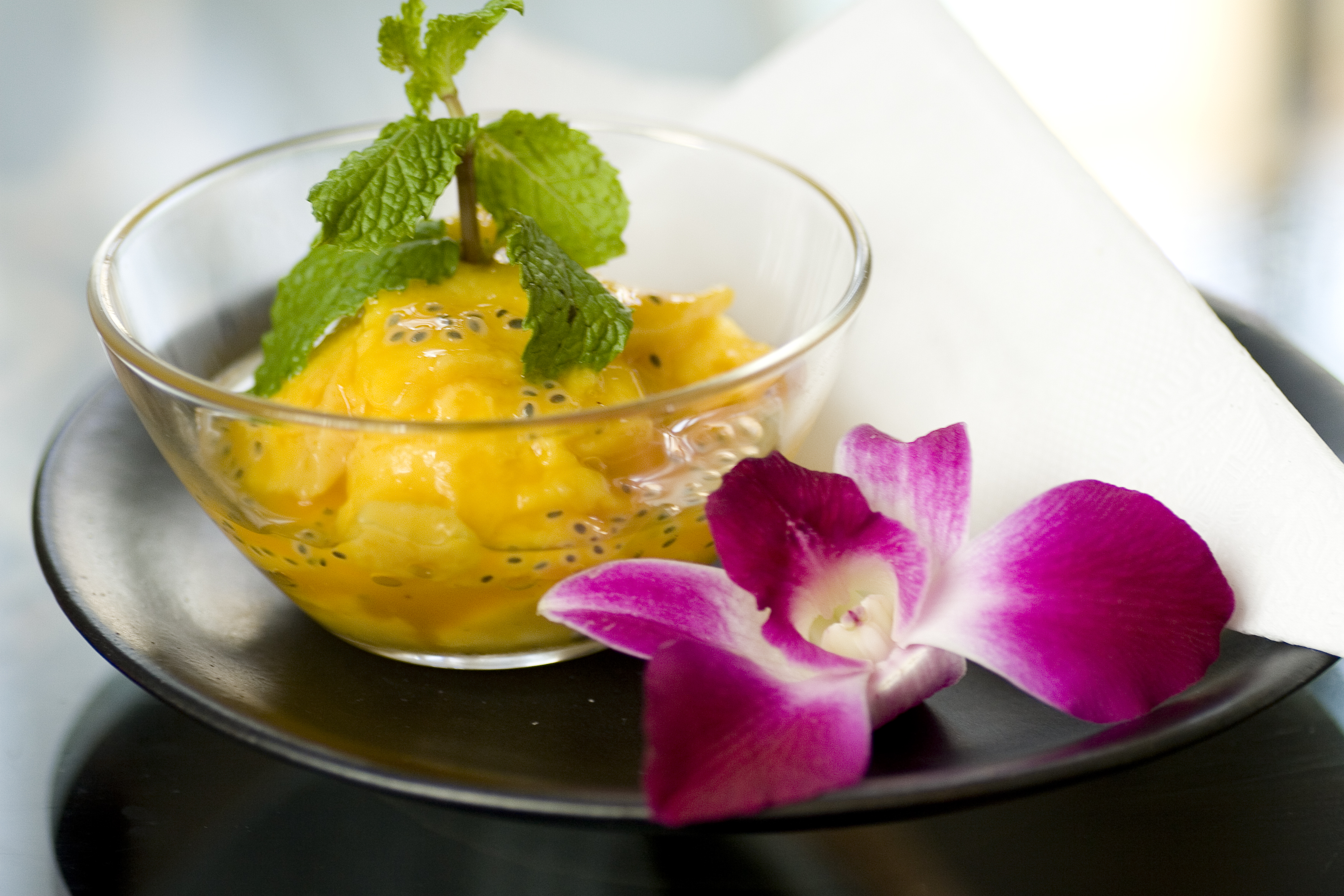
Chè xoài

== See also ==
- Vietnamese cuisine
- Cendol
- Halo halo
- Boba tea
- Tong sui
