= Chè trôi nước =

Vietnamese dessert

Chè trôi nước, bánh chay
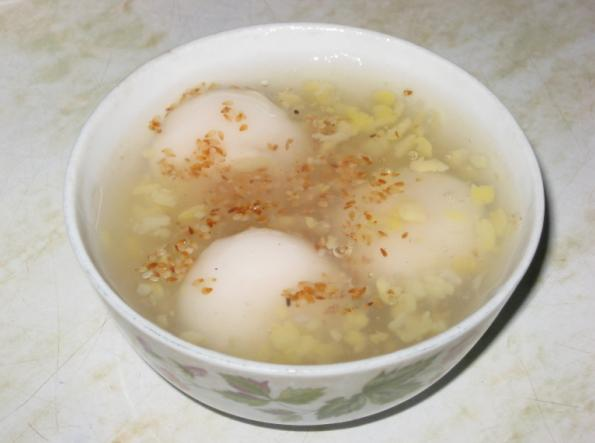
- A bowl of chè trôi nước
- Type: Dessert
- Place of origin: Vietnam
- Region or state: Southeast Asia
- Serving temperature: Warm
- Main ingredients: Mung bean paste, glutinous rice flour, water, sugar, ginger root
- Variations: Bánh trôi, bánh chay

Chè trôi nước (literally "floating dessert wading in water"; also called chè xôi nước in southern Vietnam, bánh chay in northern Vietnam) is a Vietnamese dessert made of glutinous rice filled with mung bean paste bathed in a sweet clear or brown syrup made of water, sugar, and grated ginger root. It is generally warmed before eating and garnished with sesame seeds and coconut milk. It is often served during Lunar New Year or, more recently, during the Cold-Eating Festival (March 3 in the Vietnamese calendar).

Two northern Vietnamese desserts, bánh trôi (also called bánh trôi nước) and bánh chay, are similar to chè trôi nước. Chè trôi nước is also similar to the Chinese dish tangyuan (湯圓 / 汤圆).

In southern Vietnam, three bowls of chè xôi nước are customarily prepared for Tết Ông Táo, or Ông Táo's Return to Heaven, which takes place on December 23.

== See also ==
- Chè
- Gulab jamun
- List of desserts
- Mochi
- Tangyuan
