= Keng no mai =

Laotian soup

Keng no mai sai yanang
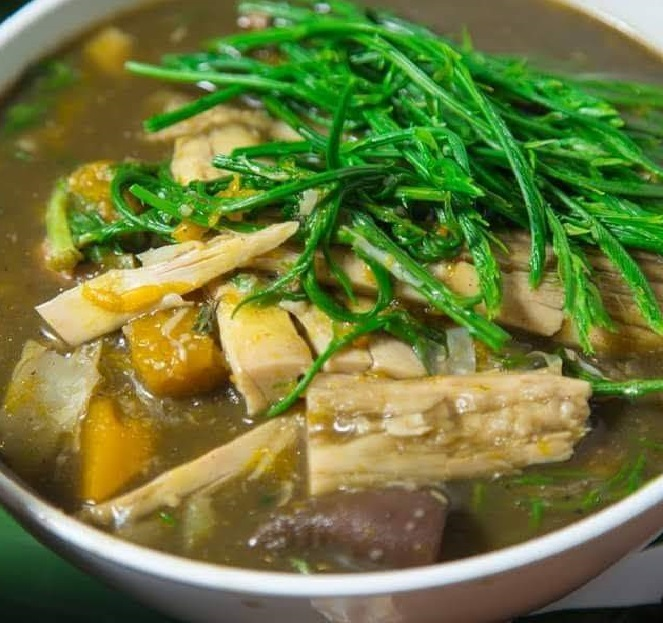
- Keng no mai sai yanang
- Alternative names: Lao bamboo soup
- Type: Soup, stew
- Place of origin: Laos
- Main ingredients: Bamboo, yanang, pork, mushrooms, pumpkin

Keng no mai sai yanang (bamboo soup and yanang leaf extract) (Lao: ແກງຫນໍ່ໄມ້ໃສ່ຢານາງ)) also known as gaeng nor mai, gaeng naw mai, gaeng nomai, kaeng no mai, kaeng nomai, kaeng Lao or Lao bamboo soup is a traditional, commonly served soup from Laos. The traditional recipe for keng no mai served to Laotian royalty can be found in a collection of handwritten recipes from Phia Sing (1898-1967), the king's personal chef and master of ceremonies. Phia Sing's handwritten recipes were compiled and published for the first time in 1981. The dish is also found in Isan, the Lao ethnic region of northeastern Thailand.

Keng no mai is made by cooking bamboo shoots, mushrooms (oysters, straw, and wood ears), okra, angled gourd, pumpkin, juices (or extract) obtained from the yanang leaves, and padaek in pork, chicken or beef broth. The soup is thickened with crushed sticky rice flour. According to personal tastes, quail eggs, eggplant, climbing wattle, and kajeng (or rice paddy herb) are also added to the soup.
