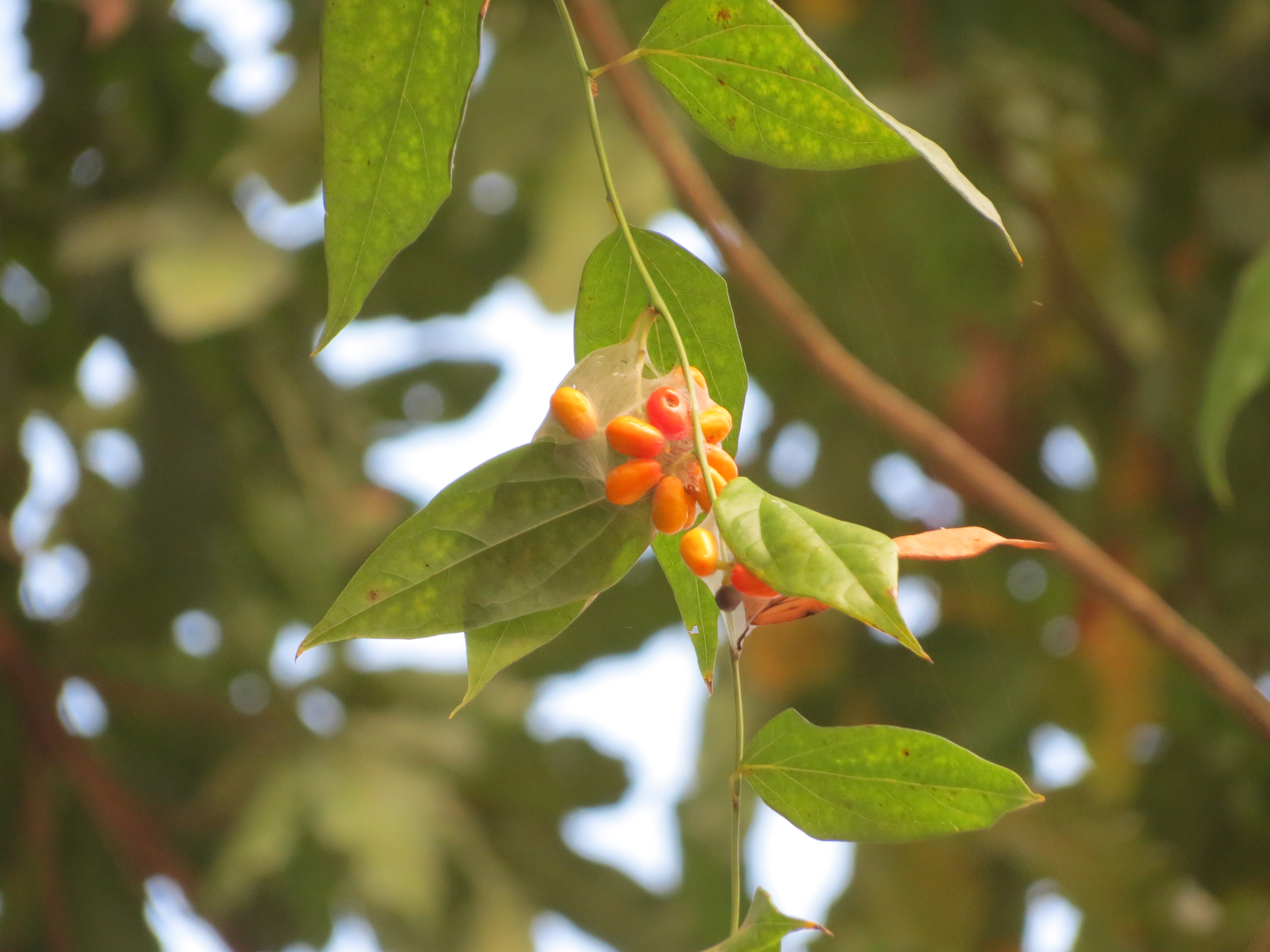
- Tiliacora acuminata

Scientific classification
- Kingdom: Plantae
- Clade: Tracheophytes
- Clade: Angiosperms
- Clade: Eudicots
- Order: Ranunculales
- Family: Menispermaceae
- Tribe: Tiliacoreae
- Genus: Tiliacora; Colebr.

Species
- See text

Synonyms
- Aristega Miers; Bagalatta Roxb. ex Rchb.; Braunea Willd.; Glossopholis Pierre; Sebicea Pierre ex Diels

= Tiliacora =

Genus of flowering plants

Tiliacora is a genus of flowering plants in the family Menispermaceae. It is native to tropical and subtropical regions of Africa, Asia and Australia.

== Description ==
Species of this genus are twining, woody climbers with simple alternate leaves. They are dioecious, meaning that pistillate (functionally female) and staminate (functionally male) flowers are borne on separate plants. Inflorescences are racemeose, often growing from the woody stem. Flowers have three or six petals and 6–12 sepals arranged in whorls of three. The fruit are drupes, roughly ovoid or obovoid in shape.

== Distribution ==
The members of this genus are variously native to the following regions: (Note: Regions as defined in the World Geographical Scheme for Recording Plant Distributions)

- Africa: Kenya, Tanzania, Uganda, Ethiopia, Somalia, Sudan, Angola, Malawi, Mozambique, Zambia, Zimbabwe, KwaZulu-Natal, Northern Provinces, Benin, Ghana, Guinea, Ivory Coast, Liberia, Nigeria, Sierra Leone, Togo, Burundi, Cabinda, Cameroon, Central African Republic, Congo, Gabon, Rwanda, Zaire
- Indian Subcontinent: Assam, Bangladesh, India, Nepal, Sri Lanka, West Himalaya
- Indo-China: Andaman Is., Cambodia, Laos, Myanmar, Thailand, Vietnam
- Malesia: Malaya
- Australia: Northern Territory, Queensland

== Species ==
As of April 2026, Plants of the World Online accepts the following 23 species:

- Tiliacora acuminata (Lam.) Miers
- Tiliacora australiana Forman
- Tiliacora bequaertii De Wild.
- Tiliacora chrysobotrya Welw. ex Ficalho
- Tiliacora cordata Merr. ex H.H.Pham
- Tiliacora dielsiana Hutch. & Dalziel
- Tiliacora dinklagei Engl.
- Tiliacora ealaensis Troupin
- Tiliacora funifera Oliv.
- Tiliacora gabonensis Troupin
- Tiliacora gossweileri Exell
- Tiliacora insularis Louis ex Troupin
- Tiliacora kenyensis Troupin
- Tiliacora klaineana (Pierre) Diels
- Tiliacora latifolia Troupin
- Tiliacora laurentii De Wild.
- Tiliacora lehmbachii Engl.
- Tiliacora leonardii Troupin
- Tiliacora leonensis (Scott Elliot) Diels
- Tiliacora louisii Troupin
- Tiliacora macrophylla (Pierre) Diels
- Tiliacora nigerica Troupin
- Tiliacora triandra (Colebr.) Diels
