= Chè bà ba =

Vietnamese dessert

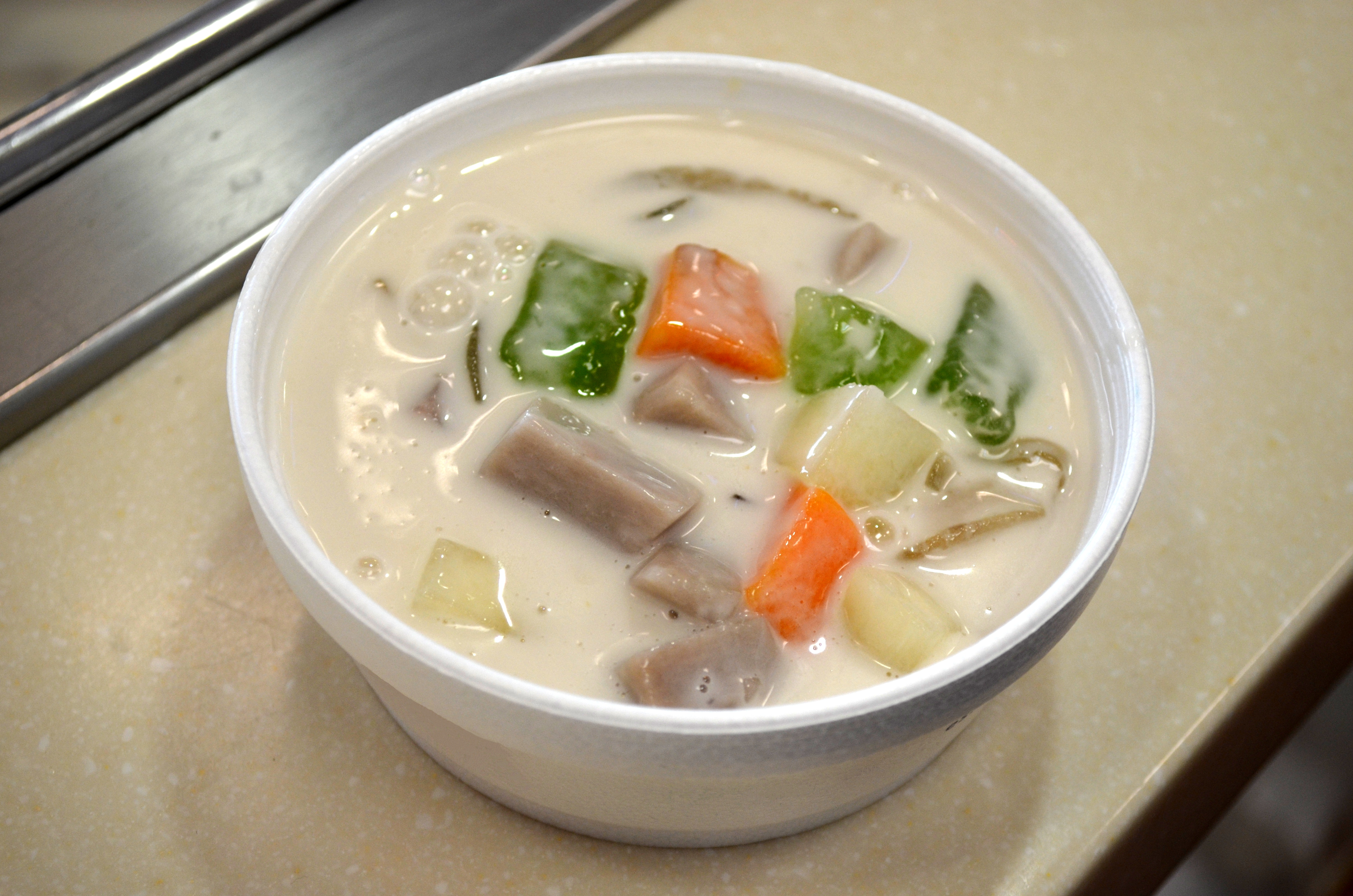
- Bowl of chè bà ba. Taro is purple, tapioca is green, light yellow is cassava, and orange is sweet potato
- Type: Chè
- Course: Dessert
- Place of origin: Vietnam
- Serving temperature: Warm or cold
- Main ingredients: Coconut milk, taro, cassava, khoai lang bí (sweet potato), tapioca

Chè bà ba is a Vietnamese dessert with a coconut milk soup base and square pieces of taro, cassava and khoai lang bí, a kind of long sweet potato with red skin and yellow flesh. The dish commonly includes pieces of tapioca, and the dish is typically eaten warm, but can also be eaten cold.

== Origins ==
The dish has many possible origins. It is possible that the dish was first made by a person whose nickname was "Third", which the name of the dish would translate to "Ms. Third's sweet soup". One story states that the dessert was sold at Bình Tây Market (in District 6, City Ho Chi Minh City ) around mid-century, and that it was originally made with coconut milk, mung bean, sweet potato, cassava, and other ingredients such as jujube and lotus seeds that totaled 9 to 10 ingredients in the dish.

According to another narrative, the dish is the third popular dish made by an old lady.

Bà ba also translates to a type of casual clothing worn in Vietnam. Another possibility for the dessert's origins is that the name means "Bà ba-wearing seller's sweet soup".

== See also ==
- Vietnamese cuisine
- Vietnamese dessert
