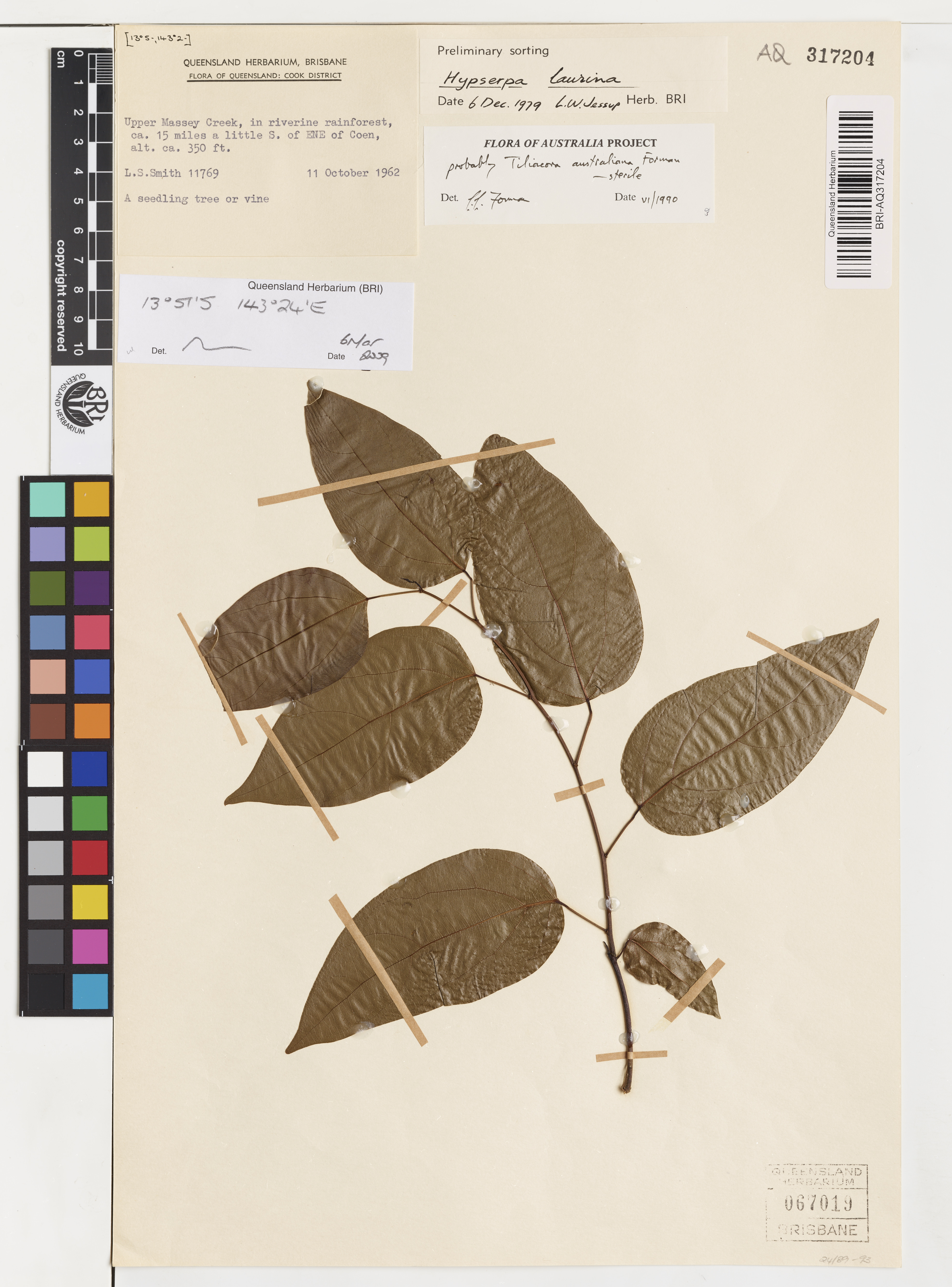
- Herbarium specimen

Conservation status
- Least Concern (NCA)

Scientific classification
- Kingdom: Plantae
- Clade: Embryophytes
- Clade: Tracheophytes
- Clade: Spermatophytes
- Clade: Angiosperms
- Clade: Eudicots
- Order: Ranunculales
- Family: Menispermaceae
- Genus: Tiliacora
- Species: T. australiana

Binomial name
- Tiliacora australiana Forman

= Tiliacora australiana =

Species of flowering plant

Tiliacora australiana is a species of plant in the family Menispermaceae. It is native to the Northern Territory and Queensland, Australia, and was first described in 1982.

== Description ==
Tiliacora australiana is a scrambling shrub or vine with a stem diameter up to 5 cm (2 in). The leaves are lanceolate to ovate-lancolate and measure up to 14 cm (5.5 in) long and 7 cm (2.8 in) wide. Inflorescences grow from the leaf axils or directly from the stem. The flowers are small, with six petals about 2 mm (0.08 in) long. The fruit is a drupe about 7 mm (0.28 in) long.

== Distribution and habitat ==
The species is known from Cape York Peninsula and the Northern Territory. It grows in gallery forest and monsoon forest at altitudes up to 250 m (820 ft).

== Conservation status ==
It is listed as least concern under the Queensland Government's Nature Conservation Act. As of June 2026, it has not been assessed by the International Union for Conservation of Nature.
