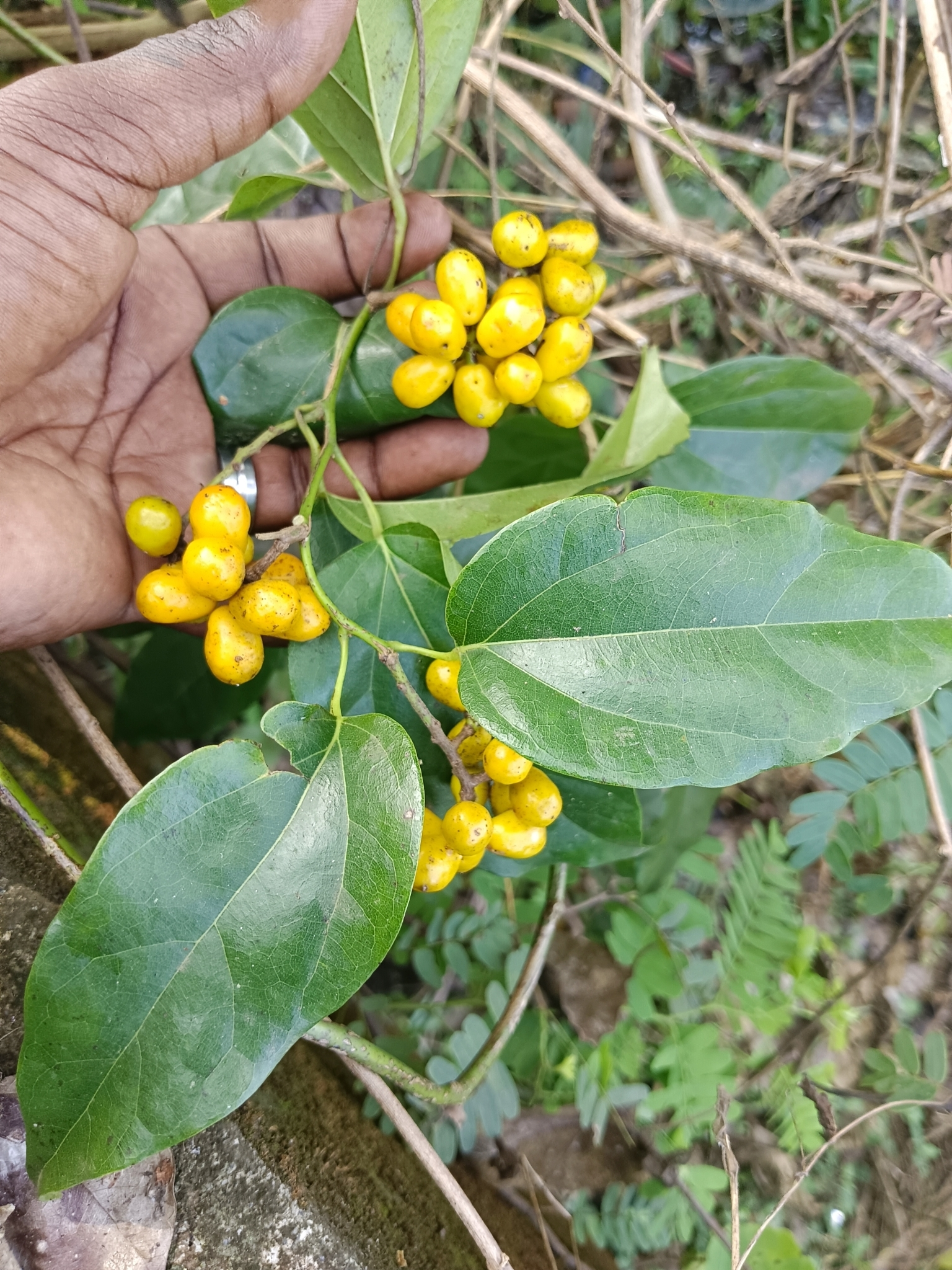

Scientific classification
- Kingdom: Plantae
- Clade: Tracheophytes
- Clade: Angiosperms
- Clade: Eudicots
- Order: Ranunculales
- Family: Menispermaceae
- Genus: Tiliacora
- Species: T. acuminata

Binomial name
- Tiliacora acuminata (Lam.) Miers

Synonyms
- Tiliacora racemosa Colebr. Tiliacora fraternaria Miers; Tiliacora cuspidiformis Miers; Tiliacora abnormalis Miers; Tiliacora radiatum Lam. Tiliacora polycarpon Roxb. Tiliacora glabrum Koen. ex Willd. Tiliacora acuminatum Lam. Tiliacora radiatus DC. Tiliacora polycarpus Wall. Tiliacora acuminatus DC. Tiliacora menispermoides Willd.

= Tiliacora acuminata =

Species of plant

Tiliacora acuminata is a large woody climbing shrub or liana native to the Indian Subcontinent and Indo-China. It grows in wet tropical biomes and is found in countries such as India, Sri Lanka, Bangladesh, Myanmar, Nepal, Vietnam, and the West Himalayas. The plant, also known as Tapering-Leaf Tiliacora, can reach heights of 5–8 meters and has ovate to lance-shaped leaves that are hairless and larger on male plants. Its inflorescences are axillary, stalked racemose cymes with small, yellow flowers, and it produces oblong-ovoid to obovoid drupes.
