= Dioscorea hamiltonii =

Scientific classification
- Kingdom: Plantae
- Clade: Tracheophytes
- Clade: Angiosperms
- Clade: Monocots
- Order: Dioscoreales
- Family: Dioscoreaceae
- Genus: Dioscorea
- Species: D. hamiltonii

Binomial name
- Dioscorea hamiltonii Hook.f.

Synonyms
- Dioscorea persimilis Prain & Burkill; Dioscorea persimilis var. pubescens C.T.Ting & M.C.Chang; Dioscorea persimilis var. wukangensis'' Hand.-Mazz.; Dioscorea raishaensis Hayata

Species of herbaceous vine

Dioscorea hamiltonii is a species of Dioscorea native to southern China, Taiwan, northern Indochina (Thailand, Vietnam, Myanmar) and the Himalayas (Nepal, Sikkim, Bhutan, Assam).

Dioscorea hamiltonii is used as an ingredient in a type of chè: chè củ mài.
