= Tiliacora lehmbachii =

Conservation status
- Endangered (IUCN 3.1)

Scientific classification
- Kingdom: Plantae
- Clade: Tracheophytes
- Clade: Angiosperms
- Clade: Eudicots
- Order: Ranunculales
- Family: Menispermaceae
- Genus: Tiliacora
- Species: T. lehmbachii

Binomial name
- Tiliacora lehmbachii Engl.

Species of flowering plant

Tiliacora lehmbachii is a species of plant in the family Menispermaceae. It is found in Cameroon and the Democratic Republic of the Congo. Its natural habitat is subtropical or tropical moist lowland forest. It is threatened by habitat loss.
