= Bánh lọt =

Sweet rice pasta dessert in Southern Vietnamese cuisine

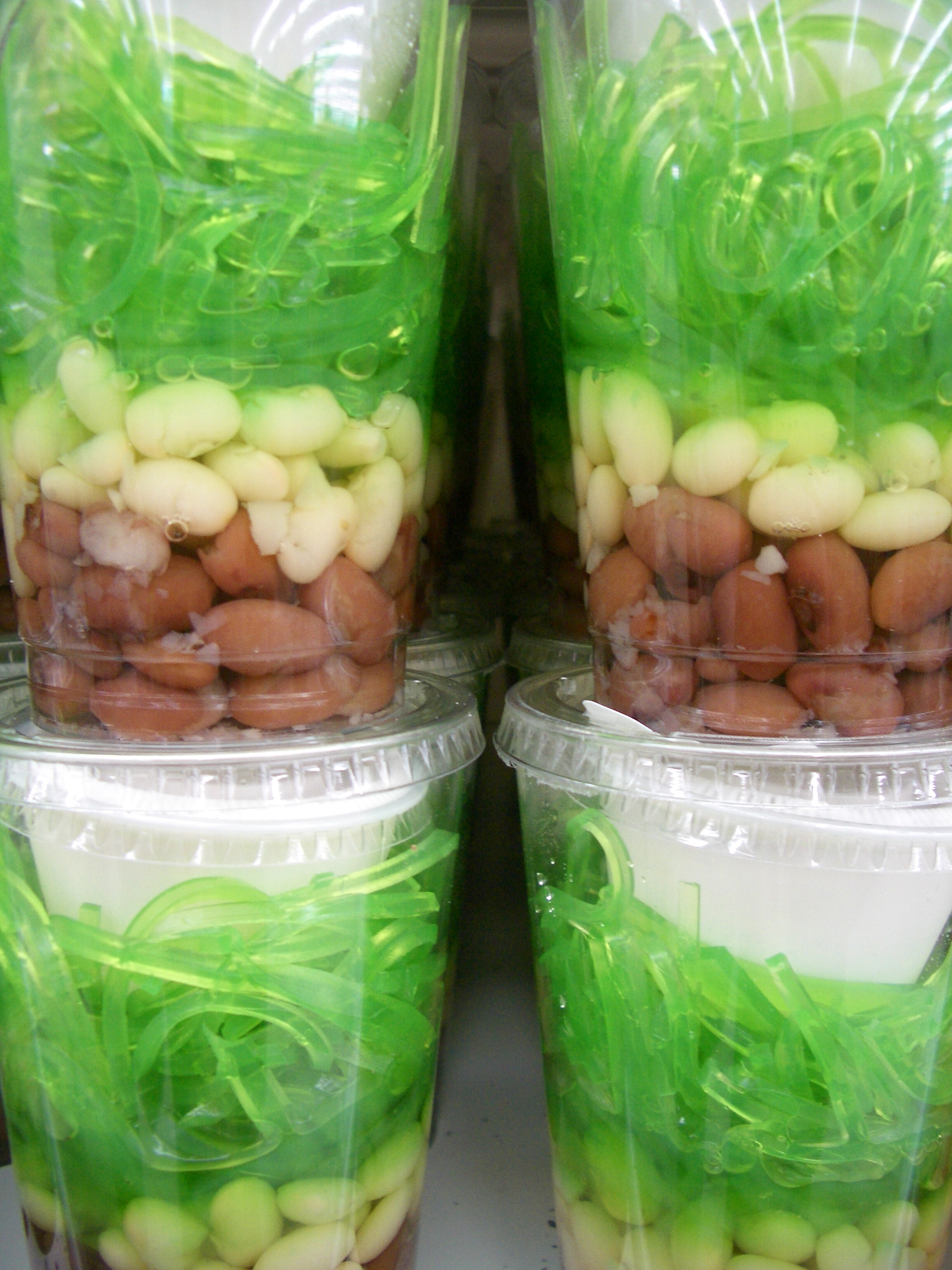
Bánh lọt (green part) in Chè Ba màu cups

Bánh lọt (lit. 'slip through cake') is sweet rice pasta dessert in southern Vietnamese cuisine. It is made with rice, salt, tapioca flour, coconut milk, sugar and water. Bánh lọt is also used to make two types of chè: chè bánh lọt and chè đậu đỏ bánh lọt (used with red beans). It is believed to have been introduced to Vietnam from Thailand, where it is called lod chong.

== See also ==
- Cendol
