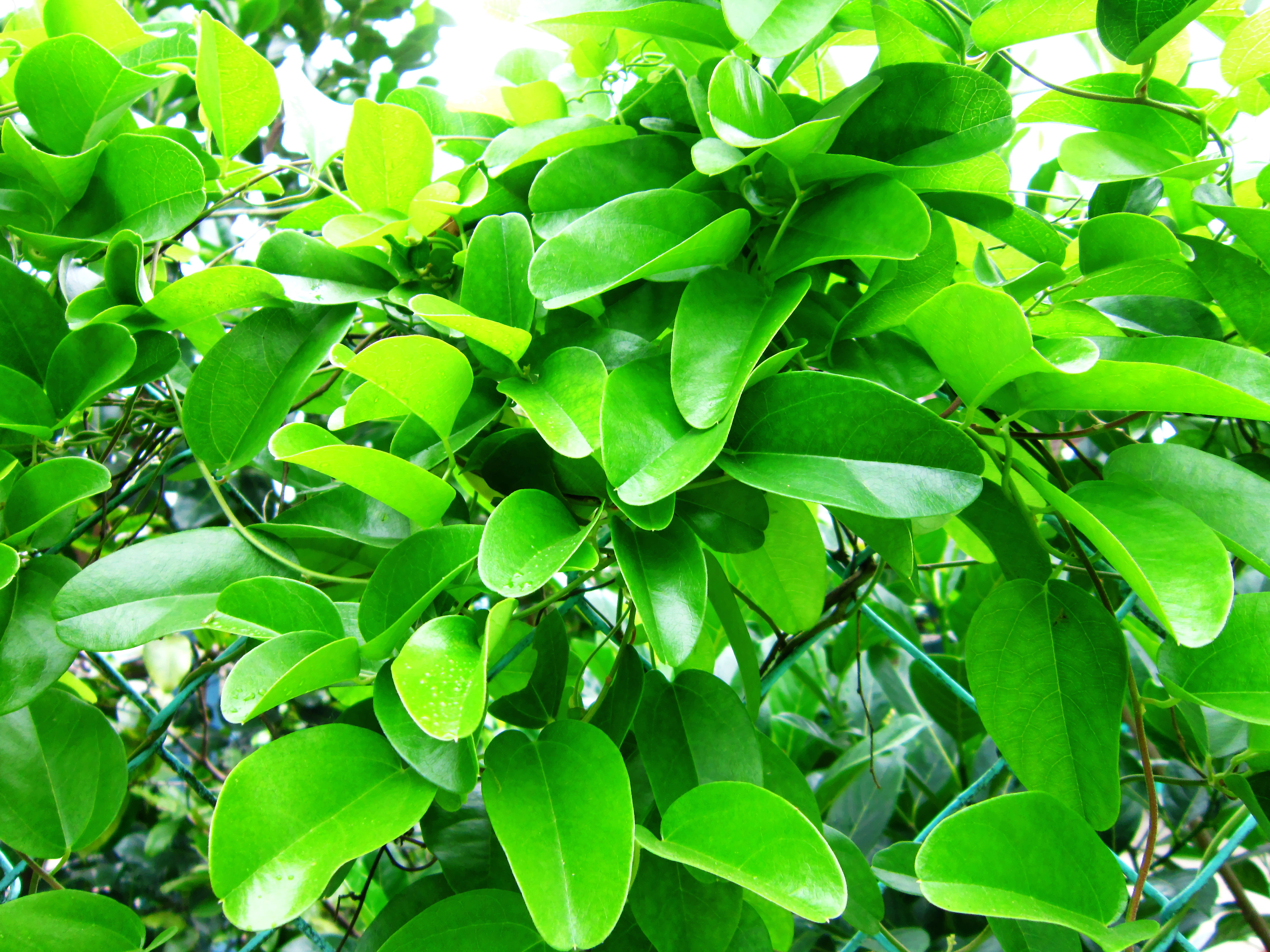

Scientific classification
- Kingdom: Plantae
- Clade: Tracheophytes
- Clade: Angiosperms
- Clade: Eudicots
- Order: Ranunculales
- Family: Menispermaceae
- Genus: Tiliacora
- Species: T. triandra

Binomial name
- Tiliacora triandra (Colebr.) Diels

= Tiliacora triandra =

Species of flowering plant

Tiliacora triandra is a species of flowering plant native to mainland Southeast Asia, and used particularly in the cuisines of northeast Thailand and Laos. In the Isan dialect of Lao, the language of northeastern Thailand, it is called bai yanang or bai ya nang (ใบย่านาง, literally "yanang leaf"), or simply yanang or ya nang (ย่านาง). In Laos, it is also called bai yanang (ໃບຢານາງ). In Khmer, it is called voar yeav (វល្លិយាវ). It is a climbing plant with deep green leaves and yellowish flowers, tolerating only very mild frost.

== Culinary use ==
In the Lao Isan culture of northeastern Thailand, the leaves are used in the preparation of kaeng no mai (Thai: แกงหน่อไม้, sometimes called kaeng Lao (Thai: แกงลาว)),^{photo}, after the ethnic Lao majority of northeastern Thailand, is a chili-hot tasting soup containing bamboo shoots, chilis, salt, and sometimes also oyster mushrooms, straw mushrooms, cha-om, or other ingredients.

Generally the leaves are not used whole, but rather a juice (or extract) made from the leaves is used to make the broth, primarily as a thickening agent rather than for its flavor. This juice may be prepared from scratch, from fresh leaves, or purchased in canned form.^{photo}

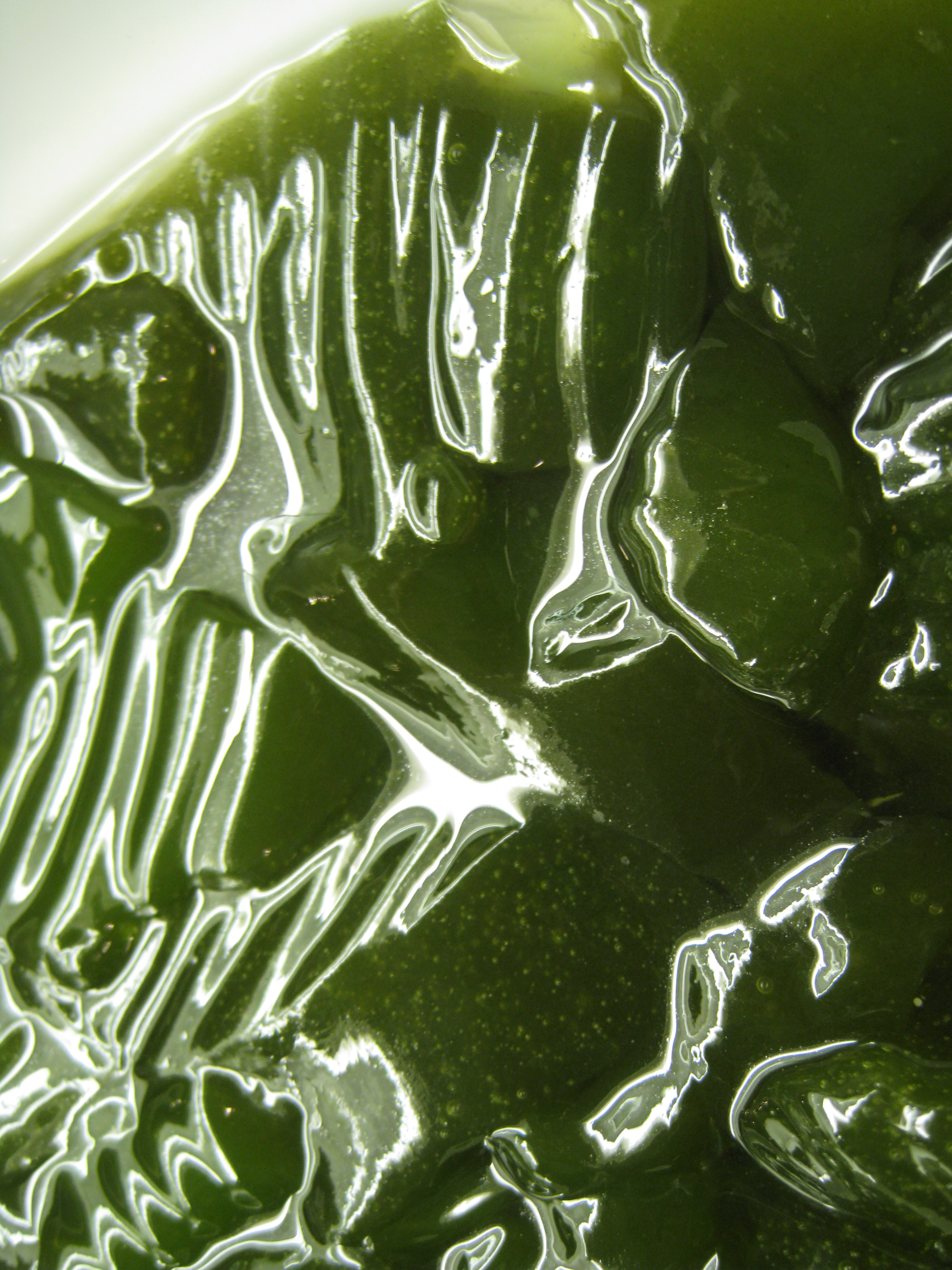
"Sương sâm" jelly in Vietnam.

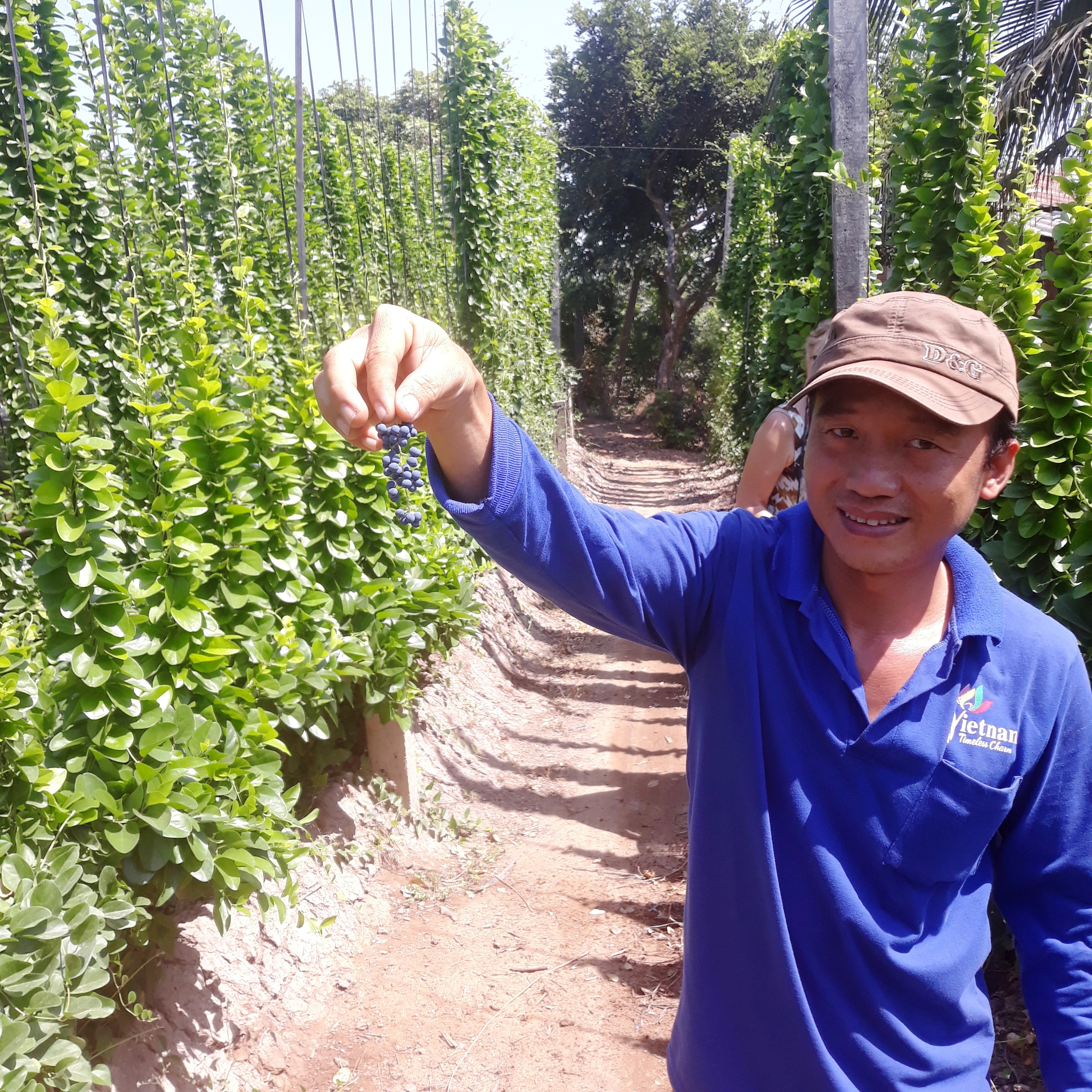
"Dây Sương Sâm" or " lá (leaf) Sâm" plant grown on an island of Bến Tre province of the Mekong Delta.

In Vietnam, the plant is called dây sương sâm, and can be made into a kind of jelly called: "sương sâm", sometimes combined with other ingredients as a beverage and desserts.

In Cambodia, it is used as an ingredient in sour soups called samlor machu.

In Laos and Thailand, the leaves are extracted with water using both hands rubbing on the leaves back and forth until all the green part in the leaves is out in the water, this is called nam yanang (Lao: ນໍ້າຢານາງ; Thai: น้ำย่านาง), meaning "yanang water". The yanang water is used to make bamboo soup. Some street vendors also sell bottled yanang water marketing it as a chlorophyll drink.

== Medicinal properties ==
In many Southeast Asian countries, the leaves and the roots of T. triandra plants are used for medicinal purposes. Reports have indicated that the native populations have used the roots and the leaves of this plant as a detoxification agent, anti-cancer, antibacterial, and anti-inflammatory agent, amongst other uses.
