= List of Chinese loanwords in Indonesian =

Due to a long history of relations and immigration between China and Indonesia, the Indonesian language has borrowed words from several Sinitic languages. The meanings of many concern cuisine, trade, or concepts related to Chinese people and culture. According to the 2000 census, Chinese Indonesians, often termed peranakan, make up almost 1% of the Indonesian population, totaling about 3 million people. Most Chinese loanwords in Indonesian come from Hokkien (a Min Nan variety); Hakka loanwords are also common, with Mandarin, Cantonese, and Teochew (another Min Nan variety) loanwords rarer but also existent.

Some of the most common include mi or mie (trans. "noodles"; simplified Chinese: 面; traditional Chinese: 麵; Pe̍h-ōe-jī: mī; Pha̍k-fa-sṳ: mien; trans. "flour, dough, noodles"), lumpia (trans. "lumpia"; simplified Chinese: 润饼; traditional Chinese: 潤餅; Pe̍h-ōe-jī: lūn-piáⁿ), teko (trans. "teapot"; simplified Chinese: 茶钴; traditional Chinese: 茶鈷; Pe̍h-ōe-jī: tê-kó͘; trans. "teapot"), kuli (trans. "slave, laborer"; Chinese: 苦力; Pe̍h-ōe-jī: ku-lí; trans. "labor, laborer"), and the slang pronouns gua (trans. "I, me"; Chinese: 我; Pe̍h-ōe-jī: góa; trans. "I, me") and lu (trans. "you"; Chinese: 汝; Pe̍h-ōe-jī: lú, lí; trans. "you"). Words of Chinese origin are presented here with Traditional and Simplified Chinese characters and relevant pronunciations.

== Loanwords ==
=== A ===
Indonesian Word	Indonesian Meaning	Chinese Character (Traditional)	Chinese Character (Simplified)	Chinese Variant	Chinese Transliteration	Chinese Meaning	Note	Ref
acik, aci	older women, such as older sister, aunt	阿姊	阿姊	Hakka	â-chí, â-chè, â-che	elder sister		
acik, aci	older women, such as older sister, aunt	阿姊	阿姊	Min Nan	a-chí, a-ché	elder sister		
akeo	son	阿哥	阿哥	Min Nan	a-ko	elder brother		
amah	Chinese female house-assistant	阿嫲	阿嫲	Cantonese	aa3 maa4	paternal grandmother		
amoi	Chinese girl	阿妹	阿妹	Hakka	amoi	younger sister		
amsiong	broken, bad luck	暗傷	暗伤	Min Nan	àm-siong	1. internal or invisible injury.; 2. indiscernible damage		
angciu	cooking wine used for food flavour enhancer	紅酒	红酒	Min Nan	âng-chiú	red wine		
anghun	red tobacco	紅薰	红薰	Min Nan	âng-hun	red smoke		
angkak	food coloring from rice fermentation by Monascus purpureus	紅麴	红曲	Min Nan	âng-khak	grains of red sticky rice (Oryza glutinosa), see also Monascus purpureus		
anglo	small stove	洪爐	洪炉	Min Nan	âng-lô͘	furnace		
anglung	pavilion	紅樓	红楼	Min Nan	âng-lô͘	red building	perhaps related to "Dream of the Red Chamber" (紅樓夢, 红楼梦)	
angpau, angpao	gift money for Chinese New Year	紅包	红包	Min Nan	âng-pau	red envelope	see also loanword from Mandarin "hongbao".	
angsiau	angsiau	紅燒	红烧	Min Nan	âng-sio	âng-sio	type of cooking style in which fish or meat is braised in soy sauce	
apek	addressing parent, mister	阿伯	阿伯	Hakka	â-pak	paternal uncle, old man	see also empek	
auban	bad person	拗蠻	拗蛮	Min Nan	áu-bân	stubborn, arrogant, brutal		

=== B ===
Indonesian Word	Indonesian Meaning	Chinese Character (Traditional)	Chinese Character (Simplified)	Chinese Variant	Chinese Transliteration	Chinese Meaning	Note	Ref
baba, babah	addressing Chinese male	爸爸	爸爸	Mandarin	bàba	father		
bacang, bakcang	glutinous rice dumpling filled with meat	肉糉	肉粽	Min Nan	bak cang	sticky rice dumpling		
batau	mantou	麵頭	面头	Min Nan	bán-thâu	mantou		
bak	(Chinese black) ink	墨	墨	Min Nan	ba̍k	1. Chinese ink or ink in general, 2. black; ink-coloured; dark		
bakiak	wooden clog	木屐	木屐	Min Nan	ba̍k-kia̍h	clog		
bakmie	(meat) noodle	肉麵	肉面	Min Nan	bah-mī	meat noodle		
bakpao, bakpau	bun	肉包	肉包	Min Nan	bah-pâu	meatbun		
bakpia	bakpia	肉餅	肉饼	Min Nan	bah-piáⁿ	bakpia	related to piáⁿ	
bakso	meatball	肉燥	肉燥	Min Nan	bah-sò	braised minced pork	alternatively from 肉球; bah-kiû; "meatball"	
baktau, baktau	madam (of a brothel), procuress	媌頭	媌头	Min Nan	bâ-thâu	madam (of a brothel), procuress		
bakwan	bakwan	肉丸	肉丸	Min Nan	bah-oân			
ban	ten thousand	萬	万	Min Nan	bān	ten thousand		
Min Nan	bîn-chi̍p							
bangking	A pomegranate-shaped container from brass or lacquer	網筐	网筐	Min Nan	bǎng-kheng	round lacquer box for storing clothes		
bangsat	1. bed bug, 2. (colloquial) bad person.	木蝨	木虱	Min Nan	ba̍t-sat, ba̍k-sat	bed bug		
banji	decorative grilles used in windows	卍字	卍字	Amoy	bān jī	swastika-like pattern in lattice work		
barongsai, baronsai	Chinese lion dance	弄獅	弄狮	Min Nan	lāng-sai	lion dance		
becak, beca	cycle rickshaw	馬車	马车	Min Nan	bé-chhia	horse-drawn carriage		
bengkoang, bengkuang	jicama (Pachyrhizus erosus)	夢光	梦光	Min Nan	bāng-kong	dream+light		
bengkong	defense building, defense wall	防城	防城	Min Nan	hông sêng			
bihun	rice vermicelli	米粉	米粉	Min Nan	bí-hún	1. rice vermicelli 2. rice flour	see also bihun	
biong	land mafia	辟王	辟王	Min Nan	phek-ōng	monarch, king		
bohsia	(Malaysia) pleasure-loving girl	無聲	无声	Min Nan	bô-siaⁿ	pleasure-loving girl? noiseless; voiceless; silent		
boksu	Chinese Christian pastor	牧師	牧师	Min Nan	bo̍k-su	pastor, minister, clergyman, priest, chaplain		
bokcoi	bok choy	白菜	白菜	Cantonese	baak6 coi3	bok choy	see bok choy (Brassica rapa chinensis)	
bokcoi	bok choy	白菜	白菜	Min Nan	be̍h-chhài	bok choy	see bok choy (Brassica rapa chinensis)	
bokek	moneyless	沒錢	没钱	Min Nan	bu̍t-chî	moneyless		
bolui	moneyless	沒鐳	没镭	Min Nan	bu̍t-lûi	moneyless	see bokek	
bong	Chinese graveyard	墓	墓	Min Nan	bōng	tomb		
bongmeh	to feel the pulse, to feel the feeling	摸脈	摸脉	Min Nan	bong-me̍h	to feel the pulse		
bongpai	gravestone	墓碑	墓碑	Min Nan	bōng-pi	grave stele		
bopeng	pockmarked	麻斑	麻斑	Min Nan	bâ-pan	pockmarked		
bopok	1. heavily damaged, 2. too frail	無卜	无卜	Min Nan	bô-pok	not going to; will not		
boto	(Jakarta) beautiful	無醜	无丑	Min Nan	bô-thiú	not ugly		
bun	small brass box	文	文	Min Nan	bûn	to cover		

=== C ===
Indonesian Word	Indonesian Meaning	Chinese Character (Traditional)	Chinese Character (Simplified)	Chinese Variant	Chinese Transliteration	Chinese Meaning	Note	Ref
ca	Cuisine made from a mixture of meat (shrimp) and vegetables (mushrooms, petai, broccoli, bamboo shoots, cauliflower), little broth and starch	炒	炒	Hokkien; Teochew	chhá ca2	to stir fry, to sauté		
cabo	(Jakarta) prostitute, whore (woman)	查某	查某	Min Nan	cha-bó͘	woman, girl		
caima	nuns in the temple who served to help the dead	菜媽	菜马	Min Nan	chhài-má	vegetarian nun, or woman		
caisim	Green mustard, Brassica chinensis	菜心	菜心	Min Nan	chhài-sim	Choy sum		
cakiak	wooden clog	柴屐	柴屐	Min Nan	chhâ-kia̍h	wooden clog		
calo	passenger recruiter, ticket scalper broker	查佬	查佬	Cantonese	caa4 lou2	man who guides passengers to bus or train for payment, broker		
calui	like to eat money (like to accept bribes or bribe)	食鐳	食镭	Min Nan	chia̍h-lûi, chiā-lûi	to take bribes		
cang	snacks made from glutinous sticky rice, chopped meat, wrapped with bamboo leaves and steamed (tasty savory)	糉 粽	粽	Min Nan	chàng	zongzi		
cah	vegetable dishes (mustard greens, mushrooms, shrimp, chicken liver, and so on) are a little juicy	炒	炒	Min Nan	chhá ca2	to stir fry, to sauté		
cap	ten	十	十	Min Nan	cha̍p	ten		
cap cai	stir fried vegetable dish	雜菜	杂菜	Min Nan	cha̍p-chhài	mixed vegetables		
capgome	lantern festival, part of Chinese new year	十五暝	十五冥	Min Nan	cha̍p-gō͘-mê cha̍p-gǒ͘-mê	lantern festival, part of Chinese new year		
capjiki	lottery twelve numbers (letters)	十二枝	十二枝	Min Nan	cha̍p-jī-ki			
cat	paint	漆	漆	Min Nan	chhat	1. varnish, lacquer, paint 2. varnish tree (Toxicodendron vernicifluum)		
catut	1. tweezers.; 2. tongs, pincers.; 3. black marketer, scalper, corrupter.	查突	查突	Min Nan	châ-tu̍t	man who guides passengers to bus or train for payment, broker		
cau	leave, bye	走	走	Min Nan	cháu, chó͘, chó	to go, to leave		
cawan	cup	茶碗	茶碗	Mandarin	cháwǎn	teacup		
ceban	ten thousand	一萬	一万	Min Nan	chi̍t-bān	ten thousand		
ceceng	one thousand	一千	一千	Min Nan	chi̍t-chheng	one thousand		
cek	elder sister	姐 姊	姐 姊	Min Nan	ché	elder sister		
ceki	gambling with small rectangular cards	一枝	一枝	Min Nan	chi̍t-ki			
cemeh	one eye blindness	睛盲	睛盲	Min Nan	chhéng-mêe	blind		
cempiang	warrior, ace	舂柄	舂柄	Min Nan	cheng-pèng	gang, robber		
cengbeng	tomb-sweeping day	清明	清明	Min Nan	chheng-bêng	qingming		
cengkau	broker	成交	成交	Min Nan	sêng-kau	to close a deal; to conclude a transaction		
cengkeh	banker (gambling)	莊家	莊家	Min Nan	chong-kee	1. banker (gambling); 2. farmhouse		
cengli	1. should be, reasonable 2. fair, honest	情理	情理	Min Nan	chêng-lí	reasonable		
cepek	one hundred	一百	一百	Min Nan	chi̍t-pah	one hundred		
cepeng	half a cent	一爿	一爿	Min Nan	chi̍t-pêng	half a cent		
ci	weight unit: 1/10 tahil (for opium)	錢	钱	Min Nan	chîⁿ	money; a measure of weight for opium		
ciaciu	sitting party	餐桌	餐桌	Cantonese	caan1 coek3	dining table		
ciak, cia	to eat	食	食	Min Nan	chiā	to eat		
cialat	misfortune	食力	食力	Min Nan	chiā-lia̍k	misfortune, bad luck; difficult		
ciami, ciamik	extraordinarily good	吃什米	吃什米	Min Nan	chiâⁿ haⁿ mi̍hⁿ	what did you eat?	alternatively from 食飽未; "are you full yet?, how are you?"	
cici	elder sister	姐姐	姐姐	Min Nan	chiá-chiá	elder sister		
cik	elder sister	姐 姊	姐 姊	Min Nan	ché	elder sister		
cim, encim	married Chinese woman	嬸	婶	Min Nan	chím	aunt (wife of father's younger brother)		
cincai, cingcai	flexible	凊彩	凊彩	Min Nan	chhìn-chhái	1. any, 2. casual; easygoing		
cincau, camcao, cingcau	Cyclea barbata, and its grass or leaves jelly product	仙草	仙草	Min Nan	sian-chháu	Chinese mesona (Platostoma palustre), and its grass jelly product		
cincu	1. ship owner representative, 2. ship captain	船主	船主	Min Nan	chûn-chú	shipowner		
cingge	cingge, march of people	妝藝	妆艺	Min Nan	chng-gē	cingge		
ciu	triple layer mat with gold decoration	蓆	蓆	Min Nan	chhio̍h	mat		
ciu, cu	spirits, liquor	酒	酒	Min Nan	chiú	alcoholic drink		
ciut	1. narrow, 2. small-minded	窄	窄	Min Nan	chiak, chek	1. narrow, tight 2. narrow-minded		
cokek	Betawi folk dance	唱曲	唱曲	Min Nan	chhiòⁿ-khek	sing song		
(Jakarta) comblang	matchmaking	作媒人	作媒人	Min Nan	chok-m̂-lâng	matchmaker		
compoh	ship chef	總鋪	总铺	Min Nan	chóng-phò͘	chef		
congki	xiangqi, the Chinese chess	象棋	象棋	Min Nan	chhiōⁿ-kî	xiangqi, the Chinese chess		
cua	afraid, tremble	懼	惧	Min Nan	kū	1. to fear; to be afraid, 2. to scare; to frighten		
cuki	xiangqi, game like dam	象棋	象棋	Min Nan	chhiǔⁿ-kî, chhiūⁿ-kî, chhiōⁿ-kî	xiangqi		
cukin	small drap covering the chest during meal	手巾	手巾	Min Nan	chhiú-kin	(hand) towel, handkerchief		
cukong	tycoon	主公	主公	Min Nan	chú-kong	Your Excellency; His Excellency		
culan	pacar cina (Aglaia odorata)	珠蘭	珠兰	Min Nan	chu-lân			
cun	length unit 1/10 feet	寸	寸	Min Nan	chhùn			
cunia	large boat for transporting goods	船仔	船仔	Min Nan	chûn-á	a boat		

=== D ===
Indonesian Word	Indonesian Meaning	Chinese Character (Traditional)	Chinese Character (Simplified)	Chinese Variant	Chinese Transliteration	Chinese Meaning	Note	Ref
dacin	balance scale	檯秤	台秤	Min Nan	tâi-chhèng	platform scales		
dimsum	dim sum	點心	点心	Cantonese	dim2 sam1	1. snack, light refreshment, 2. dim sum		

=== E ===
Indonesian Word	Indonesian Meaning	Chinese Character (Traditional)	Chinese Character (Simplified)	Chinese Variant	Chinese Transliteration	Chinese Meaning	Note	Ref
ebi	dried prawns, shrimps	蝦米	虾米	Min Nan	hê-bí hêe-bí	dried prawns, shrimps	see also ebi in Japanese	
empek	1. a kind of fishcake from Palembang, Indonesia (pempek), 2. father	阿伯	阿伯	Min Nan	a-peh	paternal uncle, old man	see also, apek	
empo	to carry on the waist	抱	抱	Min Nan	phǒ͘, phō, phǒ	1. to heft in the arms; to carry 2. to hug; to embrace		
encek	pure-blood Chinese man	阿叔	阿叔	Min Nan	a-chek	uncle (father's younger brother)		
engkah, kah	sap (to attach wood), adhesive, glue	黃膠	黄胶	Min Nan	n̂g-ka	(yellow) glue, adhesive, gum, resin		
engkoh	elder brother	阿哥	阿哥	Min Nan	a-ko	elder brother		
engkong	grandfather	阿公	阿公	Min Nan	a-kong	paternal grandfather, maternal grandfather		
engku	maternal uncle	阿舅	阿舅	Min Nan	a-kū, a-kǔ	maternal uncle		
esai	can, may	會使	会使	Min Nan	ē-sái, ē-saih, ě-sái	can, may		

=== F ===
Indonesian Word	Indonesian Meaning	Chinese Character (Traditional)	Chinese Character (Simplified)	Chinese Variant	Chinese Transliteration	Chinese Meaning	Note	Ref
fengsui	feng shui	風水	风水	Mandarin	fēngshuǐ	feng shui	see also variant hongsui, a loanword from Min Nan	

=== G ===
Indonesian Word	Indonesian Meaning	Chinese Character (Traditional)	Chinese Character (Simplified)	Chinese Variant	Chinese Transliteration	Chinese Meaning	Note	Ref
gim	(Jakarta) gold thread	金	金	Min Nan	kim, gim1	gold		
gincu	1. lipstick, 2. (cake, cookie) coloring	銀硃 銀朱	银朱	Min Nan	gîn-chu			
ginkang	body movement mastery through inner power	輕功	轻功	Min Nan	khin-kang			
gingseng	Pandare aralia ginseng	人參 人蔘	人参	Min Nan	jîn-song	ginseng (Panax sp.)		
giok	jade	玉	玉	Min Nan	gio̍k	1. jade (originally nephrite, now also including jadeite), 2. precious stone; gem, 3. pure; beautiful		
giwang	earring	耳環	耳环	Hakka	ngí-vàn	earring		
gobang, benggol	copper money with value 2.5 cent	五半	五半	Min Nan	gō͘, gǒ͘, ngó͘, gó͘- pòaⁿ, poàn			
gocap	fifty	五十	五十	Min Nan	gǒ͘-cha̍p gō͘-cha̍p			
gongli	girl who prostitutes herself for pleasure solely without fee	戇女	戆女	Min Nan	gōng-lí	stupid; foolish; simple; simple-minded + woman		
gong xi fat cai		恭喜發財	恭喜发财	Mandarin	gōngxǐfācái		a Chinese New Year greeting, literally "congratulations and be prosperous"	
gopek	five hundred	五百	五百	Min Nan; Hakka	gō͘-pah, gǒ͘-pah ńg-pak	five hundred		
gotun	five	五百	五百	Min Nan	gō͘-tún, gǒ͘-tún	five shield five (money)	money in this case refers to đồng, guilder, gulden, or rupiah	
gua	I (slang)	我	我	Min Nan	góa	I (first person, singular)		
guci	shiny-coated pitchers	罐子	罐子	Min Nan; Cantonese	koàn-chí gun3 zi2	small jar		
guo nian hao				Mandarin			a Chinese New Year greeting	

=== H ===
Indonesian Word	Indonesian Meaning	Chinese Character (Traditional)	Chinese Character (Simplified)	Chinese Variant	Chinese Transliteration	Chinese Meaning	Note	Ref
haisom	sea cucumber	海參 海蔘	海参	Min Nan	hái-som	sea cucumber		
hap	tin receptacle for prepared opium	盒	盒	Hokkien	ha̍p, a̍h, a̍p	(small) box; case		
hap	tin receptacle for prepared opium	盒	盒	Teochew	ab8	(small) box; case		
hap	tin receptacle for prepared opium	盒	盒	Cantonese	hap6, hap6-2	(small) box; case		
hia	baru cina (Artemisia vulgaris)	艾	艾	Min Nan	hiāⁿ	artemisia, mugwort		
hio	joss stick, Chinese incense	香	香	Min Nan	hioⁿ	1. fragrant; fragrance, perfume 2. joss stick; incense		
hipio	swim bladder	魚鰾	鱼鳔	Min Nan	hî-piō	swim bladder		
hisit	shark fin	魚翅	鱼翅	Min Nan	hî-chhì	shark fin		
hengkang	1. retreat, 2. escape	解間?	解间?		-kan, -gang1			
hoana	non-Han	番仔	番仔	Min Nan	hoan-á	non-Han		
hoki	luck, fortune	福氣	福气	Min Nan	hok-khì	good fortune		
honcoe	tobacco, opium pipe	煙吹 菸吹	烟吹	Min Nan	ian-chhoe	tobacco, opium pipe		
honghouw	queen	王后	王后	Min Nan	ông-hō͘	queen consort		
honghouw	queen	王后	王后	Hakka	vông-heu	queen consort		
honghouw	queen	王后	王后	Cantonese	wong5 hau6	queen consort		
hongbao	gift money for Chinese New Year	紅包	红包	Mandarin	hóngbāo	red envelope	see also loanword from Min Nan "angpau".	
hongsui	feng shui	風水	风水	Min Nan	hong-súi	feng shui	see also formal fengsui, a loanword from Mandarin	
Hokkian, Hokkien	Fujian	福建	福建	Min Nan	hok-kiàn	Fujian	see also fuk-kian, fuk-kien (Hakka) and fújiàn (Mandarin)	
Hongkong, Hong Kong	Hong Kong	香港	香港	Cantonese	hoeng1 gong2	Hong Kong		
Hongkong, Hong Kong	Hong Kong	香港	香港	Hakka	hiông-kóng	Hong Kong		
Hongkong, Hong Kong	Hong Kong	香港	香港	Min Nan	hiong-káng, hiang-káng	Hong Kong		
hopeng	trusted relation	好朋友	好朋友	Min Nan; Hakka	hó-pêng-iú hó-phèn-yû	good friend		
Honji	Chinese characters, Han characters	漢字	汉字	Cantonese; Min Nan; Hakka; Mandarin	hon-jih, hon3 zi6 hàn-jī, hàn-lī hon55 sii55, hon-sṳ hànzì	Chinese characters, Han characters		
huakiau, hoakiau	overseas Chinese	華僑	华侨	Min Nan	hôa-kiâu, hoa-kiâu	overseas Chinese		
hujin, hunjin	contribution money	分銀	分银	Min Nan	hùn-gîn	part, responsibility + money		
hun	weight measurement unit 1/100 taels = 0,378 g	分	分	Min Nan	hun	minute	see Chinese units of measurement	
hunkue	mung bean (Vigna radiata) flour, and its pastry	粉粿	粉粿	Min Nan	hún-kóe, hún-ké	fun guo		
hwahwee	Chinese association	華會	华会	Min Nan	hôa-hōe	Chinese association	see Tiong Hoa Hwee Koan (THHK), Chung Hwa Hwee Koan, (中华会馆)	
hwee	association	會	会	Min Nan	hōe	association		

=== I ===
Indonesian Word	Indonesian Meaning	Chinese Character (Traditional)	Chinese Character (Simplified)	Chinese Variant	Chinese Transliteration	Chinese Meaning	Note	Ref
imlèk	Chinese lunar calendar	陰曆	阴历	Min Nan	im-le̍k, im-lia̍k	lunar calendar		
incar	drill (for boring holes)	引插		Min Nan	íⁿ-chhah	to pull, to lead + to insert		

=== J ===
Indonesian Word	Indonesian Meaning	Chinese Character (Traditional)	Chinese Character (Simplified)	Chinese Variant	Chinese Transliteration	Chinese Meaning	Note	Ref
jelangkung, jailangkung	doll for spirit calling	伽籃公	伽篮公	Min Nan; Hakka	ch’ai-lâm-kong kia làm kûng			
Jepang	Japan	日本	日本	Hokkien	Rì-běn	Rì-běn		
ji	two	二	二	Min Nan	jī	two		
jibun	many	十分	十分	Min Nan	si̍p-hun	very, extremely, (lit. part of tenth)		
jicap	twenty	二十	二十	Min Nan	jī-cha̍p	twenty		
jicapgo	twenty five	二十五	二十五	Min Nan	jī-cha̍p-gō͘	twenty five		
jicing	opium dust	煙燼 菸燼	烟烬	Cantonese	jin1 zeon2, zeon6	smoke, tobacco, opium cinders, ashes, embers		
jinsom	ginseng, root preparation	人參 人蔘	人参	Min Nan	jîn-song	ginseng (Panax sp.)	see ginseng	
jitu	accurate, precise	得著	得着	Min Nan	tit-tio̍h	1. to get, to obtain, to receive 2. something gained (usually intangible)	?	
jok	seat, padded seating	褥	褥	Min Nan; Cantonese	jio̍k juk6	1. cotton-padded mattress, mattress, cushion 2. bedding		
juhi	dried squid	鰇魚	鰇鱼	Min Nan	jiû-hî	squid		
jung	boat, Chinese junk	船	船	Hokkien; Teochew	chûn, soân zung5	boat, Chinese junk		

=== K ===
Indonesian Word	Indonesian Meaning	Chinese Character (Traditional)	Chinese Character (Simplified)	Chinese Variant	Chinese Transliteration	Chinese Meaning	Note	Ref
kailan	gai lan	芥蘭	芥兰	Cantonese	gaai3 laan4-2	gai lan	gai lan (Brassica oleracea var. alboglabra) is the Cantonese name and jie lan is the Mandarin name for a vegetable that is also known as Chinese broccoli or Chinese kale.	
kalo	strainer	過濾	过滤	Min Nan	kè-lū	to filter		
kampuh	covering	蓋布 蓋佈	盖布	Min Nan	kah-pò͘	to put on, to apply, cloth; textiles		
kamsia	to thank, to be grateful, to be appreciative	感謝	感谢	Min Nan	kám-siā	to thank, to be grateful, to be appreciative		
kana	1. preserved olives 2. bunga tasbih (Canna orientalis)	橄欖	橄榄	Min Nan	káⁿ-ná, kaⁿ-ná, kán-ná, kan-ná	Chinese olive (Canarium album), which is dried or candied, or are eaten (the nuts)		
kang	a large wide-mouthed bathing-jar	缸	缸	Min Nan	kong, kng	earthen jug, crock, cistern		
kangtau	unexpected fortune, opportunity	空頭	空头	Min Nan	khang-thâu	1. nominal; phony 2. (stock exchange) bear, shorts		
kau	nine	九	九	Min Nan	káu	nine		
kau	dog	狗	狗	Min Nan	káu	dog		
kecap	soy sauce	茄汁	茄汁	Cantonese	ke4-2 zap1	1. tomato juice 2. ketchup	ketchup is saus tomat, not kecap	
kēcoak, kacoak, kēcuak, kēcoa	(Jakarta) cockroach	虼蚻		Min Nan	ka-choa̍h, kǎ-choa̍h, ka-chōa	cockroach		
kelong	large sea fish trap with two or three compartments	雞籠 鷄籠	鸡笼	Min Nan	kelông, kelóng	batteries (cages for hen)		
kelontong	grocery, hawker	玲瓏鼕 玲瓏冬	玲珑冬	Min Nan	lêng-lông-tong	brightly clear+winter	probably onomatopoeic	
kemoceng	feather duster	雞毛筅 鷄毛筅	鸡毛筅	Min Nan	ke-mo͘ -chhéng, ke-mô͘-chhéng	chicken+feather+brush		
kenceng	drill worked with a bow	弓鑽	弓钻	Min Nan	keng-chǹg	bow+drill		
kèpo	(colloquial) busybody	雞婆		Min Nan	ke-pô	(slang) busybody		
kèpo	(colloquial) busybody	家婆		Min Nan	ke-pô	(slang) busybody		
kērangkeng	cage	櫳間	栊间	Min Nan	lông-keng	(old-fashioned) prison, jail		
kiaupau	population	僑胞	侨胞	Min Nan	kiâu-pau	countryman living abroad, overseas compatriots		
kimantu	pure-blood Chinese	饑滿肚 飢滿肚	饥满肚	Hakka; Min Nan	kî mân tú ki-móa-tǒ͘			
kimlo	soup vegetable with meat	金爐	金炉	Min Nan	kîm-lù			
kin	a unit of weight, catty; = 16 niún (= 600 gms)	斤	斤	Min Nan	kin	catty, a unit of weight		
kio	stretcher	轎	轿	Min Nan	kiō	palanquin, litter		
kipsiau	teapot	急燒	急烧	Min Nan	kip-siau	quick heat		
kiwi	supercargo, guest in ship	客位	客位	Min Nan	kheeh-ūi	guest+position		
klenteng	Chinese folk religion temple	觀音亭	观音亭	Min Nan	koan-im-têng	Guanyin temple		
koa	name of game	卦	卦	Min Nan	kòa			
koki	chef	厨师	厨师	Cantonese	Chú-shī			
kolesom	ginseng	高麗參 高麗蔘	高丽参	Min Nan	ko-lê-sim, ko-lê-sam, ko-lê-som	Korean ginseng		
Kong Hu Cu, Kong Cu	Confucius, Confucianism	孔夫子 孔子	孔夫子 孔子	Min Nan	Khóng Hu-chú; Khóng-chú	Confucius		
kongkalikong	dishonest, secretive, knowing and knowing (in doing something that is not good), conspiring	公共儞講	公共你讲	Min Nan	kong-kā-lí-kóng	public-shares-you-discuss		
(Jakarta) kongko	meaningless talk	講古	讲古	Min Nan	kóng-kó͘	to tell stories		
kongkoan	1. public building, 2. Chinese council building	公館	公馆	Min Nan	kong-koán	1. imperial guesthouse, 2. grand residence of rich or important person		
kongsi	1. commercial association, partnership.; 2. group, association.; 3. landlord office	公司	公司	Min Nan	kong-si	1. company, firm, corporation 2. Kongsi, clan hall		
konian	Chinese new year celebration	過年	过年	Hakka	ko-ngièn, ko-ngiàn	1. to spend (celebrate) the Chinese New Year; 2. (colloquial) next year	see also kweni	
koteng	alone, friendless	孤丁	孤丁	Min Nan	ko͘-teng	loneliness+person		
koyo	medicinal plaster	膏藥	膏药	Hakka	kâu-yo̍k, kò-yo̍k	herbal plaster; medicated patch; poultice		
koyo	medicinal plaster	膏藥	膏药	Min Nan	ko-io̍h, ko͘-io̍h	herbal plaster; medicated patch; poultice		
ku	tortoise; cake	龜	龟	Min Nan	ku, kui	turtle; tortoise		
kuaci	watermelon seed, dried.	瓜子	瓜子	Min Nan	koa-chí	edible seed consumed as a snack		
kucai	Allium adorum	韭菜 韮菜	韭菜	Min Nan	kú-chhài	garlic chives; Chinese chives (Allium tuberosum)	in Hakka, Allium tuberosum is 快菜 (khuai-chhoi, kuai4 coi4)	
kue	cake, pastries	粿	粿	Min Nan	kóe	rice cake		
kuli	slave, labourer, heaver	苦力	苦力	Min Nan	ku-lí	1. labor; hard work 2. coolie; laborer		
kungfu	kung fu	功夫	功夫	Hakka	kûng-fû	kung fu		
kungfu	kung fu	功夫	功夫	Cantonese	gung1 fu1	kung fu		
kungtau	fist	拳頭	拳头	Min Nan	kûn-thâu	fist		
kuntuan	satin-like silk	裙緞	裙缎	Min Nan	kûn-toān	skirt, apron, dress satin		
Kwan Im	Guanyin	觀音 觀世音	观音 观世音	Min Nan	Koan-im; Koan-sè-im	Guanyin	Chinese interpretation of Avalokitesvara	
kweni	Chinese new year celebration	過年	过年	Min Nan	kè-nî, kèr-nî, kòe-nî	1. to spend (celebrate) the Chinese New Year; 2. (colloquial) next year	see also konian	
kwetiau, kuetiau	kway teow (flat noodle)	粿條	粿条	Min Nan	kóe-tiâu	kway teow		

=== L ===
Indonesian Word	Indonesian Meaning	Chinese Character (Traditional)	Chinese Character (Simplified)	Chinese Variant	Chinese Transliteration	Chinese Meaning	Note	Ref
lampan	to mine, to mold	淋板	淋板	Min Nan	lâm-pán	to pour + tin plate		
lan	phosphorus	磷	磷	Cantonese	leon4, leon6	phosphorus		
lancia	Two-wheeled carts, moved by people. rickshaw	人車	人车	Min Nan	lâng-chhia	rickshaw		
langkan	1. balcony.; 2. balustrade, railing.	欄杆	栏杆	Min Nan	lân-kan	railing, handrail, banister		
langsai	1. paid, settled (debt).; 2. curtain							
langseng	steamer basket	籠床 籠牀	笼床	Min Nan	lâng-sn̂g	steamer basket		
lengkeng, longan	longan (Euphoria longana)	龍眼	龙眼	Min Nan	lêng-kéng	longan (Euphoria longana)		
lengking	shrill, strident	隆輕	隆轻	Min Nan	liông-khin, liông-kheng			
letoi	weak because tired	力退	力退	Cantonese	lik6 teoi3			
letoi	weak because tired	力退	力退	Min Nan	la̍t-thè, le̍k-thòe			
lianglong	Chinese dragons played by a number of people	亮龍	亮龙	Min Nan	liāng-liông	bright+dragon		
lici, leci	lychee (Litchi chinensis)	荔枝	荔枝	Min Nan	lē-chi	lychee (Litchi chinensis)		
lihai	skillful	厲害	厉害	Min Nan	lī-hāi	fierce, serious (informal) excellent; amazing; fantastic		
ling	measurement unit	鯪	鲮					
lio	burning bricks (tiles)	寮	寮	Min Nan	liâu	shanty, hut, shack		
liong	Chinese dragon	龍	龙	Min Nan	liông	Chinese dragon		
loak	1. second-hand, 2. trash bins	籮	箩	Min Nan	lôa	bamboo basket		
lobak	radish (Raphanus sativus)	蘿蔔	萝卜	Cantonese	lo4 baak6	1. radish, 2. turnip, 3. daikon; Chinese radish		
lonceng	bell	亂鐘	乱钟	Min Nan	lōan-cheng	alarm clock		
lokcuan	Chinese silk	羅串	罗串	Min Nan	lô-chhoàn, lô͘-chhoàn			
lokek	stingy, parsimonious	落錢	落钱	Min Nan	lo̍k-chî	drop money		
loki	prostitutes	老妓	老妓	Min Nan	ló͘-kī, ló-ki	old, experienced, always prostitutes, female entertainer		
lokio	chives (Allium schoenoprasum)	蕗蕎	蕗蕎	Min Nan	lō͘-kiō, lō͘-giō	scallion		
loknan	hardship	落難	落难	Cantonese	lok6 naan6	to meet with misfortune; to be in distress		
loksek	bankrupt	蕗息	蕗息	Cantonese	lok6 sik1	fall down+to cease		
loksun	dry cough	咯咯聲	咯咯聲	Cantonese	lok1 lok1 seng1	cackle, chuck	?	
loktong	prostitutes	樂桶	乐桶	Min Nan	lo̍k-thóng	enjoy, love	?	
loleng	paper lantern	牢籠	牢笼	Min Nan	lô-lang		?	
lontong	a kind of rice cake from Indonesia	龍通	龙通	Mandarin	lóngtōng			
loténg, laoteng	2nd storey of a house, attic	樓頂	楼顶	Min Nan	lâu-téng	upstair		
lu	you (slang)	汝 你	汝 你	Min Nan	lú lí	you (second person, singular)		
lumpia	spring roll	潤餅	润饼	Min Nan	lǔn-piáⁿ	spring roll		

=== M ===
Indonesian Word	Indonesian Meaning	Chinese Character (Traditional)	Chinese Character (Simplified)	Chinese Variant	Chinese Transliteration	Chinese Meaning	Note	Ref
makao	woven yarn of cotton yarn, whitish color	馬狗			má-káu	Macau		
makaopo	prostitute	馬狗婆			má-káu-pô͘	Macau		
mesiu	gunpowder	芒硝	芒硝	Min Nan	mêe-siau	1. mirabilite, 2. sodium sulfate		
mi, mie	noodle	麵	面	Min Nan	mī	flour, dough, noodle		
mi, mie	noodle	麵	面	Hakka	mien	flour, dough, noodle		
mihun	rice vermicelli	麵粉, 麪粉	面粉	Min Nan	mī-hún	flour		
misoa	misua	麵線, 麪線	面线	Min Nan	mī-soàⁿ	flour		
mopit	Chinese writing brush	毛筆	毛笔	Min Nan	mô͘-pit	calligraphy brush, inkbrush		
mua	eel	鰻	鳗	Min Nan	môa	eel		

=== N ===
Indonesian Word	Indonesian Meaning	Chinese Character (Traditional)	Chinese Character (Simplified)	Chinese Variant	Chinese Transliteration	Chinese Meaning	Note	Ref
nanyang	Southeast Asia (nanyang)	南洋	南洋	Mandarin	nányáng	southern ocean		
nopek	two hundred	兩百	两百	Min Nan	nō͘ -pah	two hundred		
nyolo	censer	香爐	香炉	Min Nan	hiuⁿ-lô͘	incense burner		
nyonya	madame, lady	娘惹	娘惹	Cantonese	noeng3 ja1	beloved perfect woman		

=== O ===
Indonesian Word	Indonesian Meaning	Chinese Character (Traditional)	Chinese Character (Simplified)	Chinese Variant	Chinese Transliteration	Chinese Meaning	Note	Ref
o	black	烏	乌	Min Nan	o͘	black, dark	such as in Kopi O	
obeng	screwdriver	窩鋒	窝锋	Min Nan	o-hong			
ong	emperor, king	王	王	Min Nan	ông	king, monarch, champion		
ongji	license, permit	王字	王字	Min Nan	ông jī	king, monarch, champion +word, letter, contract		
ongji	license, permit	允許	允许	Min Nan	ún-hí	to permit, to allow		
oto	bib	圍兜	围兜	Min Nan	û-to͘	bib		

=== P ===
Indonesian Word	Indonesian Meaning	Chinese Character (Traditional)	Chinese Character (Simplified)	Chinese Variant	Chinese Transliteration	Chinese Meaning	Note	Ref
pai	to pay respect with hands clasped before the chest	拜	拜	Min Nan	pài	to do obeisance; bow; kowtow		
pakau	a Chinese card game	拍九	拍九	Min Nan	phah-káu		?	
pakpui	divination	卜杯	卜杯	Min Nan	pok-poe			
pangkin, pangkeng	sleeping room, bed	房間	房间	Min Nan	pâng-kuiⁿ, pâng-keng	room		
panglong	lumber mill	枋廊	枋廊	Min Nan	pang-lông	timber gallery		
pangsi	black silk	紡絲	纺丝	Min Nan	pháng-si	spin, weave silk	?	
pangsi	black silk	墨絲	墨丝	Min Nan	ba̍k-si	dark, black silk	?	
pangsit	wonton	扁食	扁食	Min Nan	pián-si̍t	wonton	A wonton is a type of Chinese dumpling commonly found across regional styles of Chinese cuisine.	
patka	a talisman in the form of a sheet of paper written with Chinese characters	八卦	八卦	Min Nan	pat-kòa	eight divinatory trigrams of the I Ching		
pauhi	abalone	鮑魚	鲍鱼	Min Nan	pau-hî	abalone		
pao-pao, opau	small pocket	荷包	荷包	Min Nan	hô-pau	small pocket		
pecai, pakcoi	napa cabbage (Brassica rapa pekinensis)	白菜	白菜	Min Nan	pe̍h-chhài	napa cabbage (Brassica rapa pekinensis)		
pecun, pehcun	Dragon Boat Festival	扒船	扒船	Min Nan	pê-chûn	rowing		
pehong	venereal disease, syphilis	病瘋 瘡痕 病毒	病疯 瘡痕 病毒	Min Nan	pēng-hong chhng-hûn pīⁿ-to̍k, pēⁿ-to̍k	fast+ill sore virus	?	
pengki	dustpan	畚箕	畚箕	Min Nan	pun-kî	bamboo or wicker scoop; dustpan		
pia	bet, stake	拚	拚	Min Nan	piàⁿ	risk		
picis	ten cent	貝子	贝子	Min Nan; Hakka	pòe-chí pi chṳ́	small shellfish, currency		
pit	Chinese brush	筆	笔	Min Nan	pit	Chinese brush		
po	a gambling game	寶	宝	Min Nan	pó, pó͘	a kind of gambling device		
poko	bijanggut Mentha (Mentha arvensis)	薄荷	薄荷	Min Nan	po̍h-hô, po̍k-hô	mint (Mentha) plants, including peppermint		
poo	oil extract from merdinah (Mentha merdinah) and poko (Mentha orvensib)	薄荷	薄荷	Min Nan	po̍h-hô, po̍k-hô	mint (Mentha) plants, including peppermint		
potehi	Chinese glove puppetry	布袋戲	布袋戏	Min Nan	pò͘-tē-hì	glove puppetry		
potia	overseer	部長	部長	Min Nan	pō͘-tiúⁿ	head of department, section chief		
puatang	fail, unlucky	破桶	破桶	Min Nan	phòa-tháng	broken drum		
punci	alright, fortunately	本錢	本钱	Min Nan	pún-chîⁿ	capital, position, skill, experience		
puyonghai, fuyonghai	egg foo yung	芙蓉蛋	芙蓉蛋	Cantonese	fu4 jung4 daan6-2	egg foo yung		
puyonghai, fuyonghai	egg foo yung	芙蓉蟹	芙蓉蟹	Cantonese	fu4 jung4 haai5	egg foo yung with crab		

=== S ===
Indonesian Word	Indonesian Meaning	Chinese Character (Traditional)	Chinese Character (Simplified)	Chinese Variant	Chinese Transliteration	Chinese Meaning	Note	Ref
sai	lion	獅	狮	Min Nan	sai	lion		
sam	three	三	三	Min Nan	saⁿ, sam	three		
samcan	pork belly	三層	三层	Min Nan	sam-chàn	pork belly		
sampan	sampan, a kind of boat	舢板 三板	舢板 三板	Min Nan	san-pán	sampan		
samseng	to go to someone mourning	三牲	三牲	Min Nan	sam-sng, sam-seng	three domestic animals	three domestic animals (cattle, sheep, and pigs) used as sacrificed offerings during mourning.	
samsu	sugarcane liquor	三燒	三烧	Cantonese	saam1 siu1	lit. thrice burnt		
sancan	beef flank	三層	三层	Min Nan	saⁿ-chàn	pork belly	see samcan	
sekoteng	a ginger-flavoured hot drink	四果湯	四果汤	Min Nan	sì-kó͘, kó-thng, thong			
Seh	surname	姓	姓	Min Nan; Cantonese	sèng, sìⁿ, sèⁿ sing3, seng3	surname		
sempoa	abacus	算盤	算盘	Min Nan	sǹg-pôaⁿ	abacus		
sentiong	Chinese graveyard	新塚	新塚	Min Nan	sin-thióng	new graveyard		
si	four	四	四	Min Nan	sì, sù, sìr	four		
sian	such	相	相	Min Nan	siang	towards each other, one another		
siantan	Ixora concinna	仙丹花	仙丹花	Min Nan	sian-tan	Ixora chinensis	lit. elixir of life	
siau	cooled	消	消	Min Nan	siau	dissolve, remove, lost weight, cost		
sie-sie	thanks	謝謝	谢谢	Mandarin	xièxie	thanks		
sikak	piece of iron starfruit (weapon)	四角	四角	Min Nan	sì-kak	four angle, four corner	perhaps like caltrop or shuriken	
sincia	Chinese new year	新正	新正	Min Nan	sin-chiaⁿ	first month of the lunar new year, first day of the lunar new year, Chinese new year		
sinci	spirit tablet	神位	神位	Min Nan	sîn-ūi	spirit tablet		
singkék	Chinese newcomer (derogative), pure blooded Chinese, i.e. not of mixed ancestry	新客	新客	Min Nan	sin-khek	new guest, new outsider, new Hakka		
singkong	cassava (Manihot esculenta)	新光	新光		sin-kong	new, fresh; bright	?	
sinsé	Chinese medicine practitioner	先生	先生	Min Nan	sin-seⁿ	doctor, teacher	see also sensei, Japanese loanword	
sio, shio	Chinese zodiac	生肖	生肖	Min Nan	sng-siàu, seng-siàu	Chinese zodiac		
sioca	miss (term of address)	小姐	小姐	Min Nan	sió-chiá, sia̋u-chê	miss (term of address), young lady, prostitute		
siong	cigarette with rhubarb and incense	松 鬆 相	松 松 相	Min Nan	siông sang, song siong, siòng	pear, fir loose, relax minister (Chinese chess)		
siongka	dammar gum, rosin	松膠	松膠	Min Nan	siông-ka	pine + resin, gum	(松香, 松脂)	
siuh	"be off"	收	收	Min Nan	siu	to put something away		
siomay, siomai	shumai (wrapped and steamed with fillings)	燒賣	烧卖	Min Nan	sio-māi	shumai		
soe	bad luck	衰	衰	Min Nan	soe	1. to grow weak, to decrease in strength 2. to have poor luck		
sohun	cellophane noodles, Chinese vermicelli	索粉	索粉	Min Nan	soh-hún	cellophane noodles, Chinese vermicelli	synonym of 冬粉	
soja	to bow	作揖	作揖	Cantonese	zok3 jap1	make a bow with hands clasped		
som	folds on the fabric edge	純	纯	Min Nan	sûn	border of a piece of clothing		
sosi	key	鎖匙	锁匙	Hokkien; Teochew; Hakka; Cantonese	só-sî so2 si5 só-sṳ́, só-sṳ̀ so2 si4	key		
soto	soto	燒肚	烧肚	Min Nan	sio-to	cook + animal stomach (as food)	?	
shou sui	to stay up late or all night on New Year's Eve	守歲	守岁	Mandarin	shǒusuì	to stay up late or all night on New Year's Eve		
suah	already, finished	煞	煞	Min Nan	soah	finish, complete		
suceng	square, honest	四正	四正	Min Nan; Cantonese	sì-chiàⁿ si3 zeng3	neat and proper		
suhian	brothel	私軒	私轩	Min Nan	su-hian	personal, private + pavilion		
suhu	teacher of the art of (Chinese) self-defence	師父	师父	Min Nan	su-hū	master, master worker		
sun	tobacco	純	纯	Min Nan	sûn	pure, clean		
swike	swikee	水雞 水鷄	水鸡	Min Nan	súi-ke	frog		
swipoa, sempoa	abacus, suanpan	算盤	算盘	Min Nan	sǹg-pôaⁿ	suanpan	see also soroban, Japanese loanword	
Sun Go Kong	Sun Wukong	孫悟空	孙悟空	Min Nan	Sun Ngō͘-khong	Sun Wukong, Goku	see also Son Goku from Japanese	

=== T ===
Indonesian Word	Indonesian Meaning	Chinese Character (Traditional)	Chinese Character (Simplified)	Chinese Variant	Chinese Transliteration	Chinese Meaning	Note	Ref
taci	elder sister	大姊	大姊	Min Nan	tōa-chí, tōa-ché	elder sister		
tahang	barrel	桶	桶	Min Nan	thóng	pail, bucket		
tahu	tofu	豆腐	豆腐	Min Nan	tāu-hū	tofu, bean curd	see also tofu, from Japanese	
taifun	tropical cyclone	颱風	台风	Hakka	thòi-fûng	tropical cyclone		
taiko	wealthy businessman							
taiko	leprosy	癩哥	癞哥	Min Nan	thái-ko	leprosy	(癩⿸疒哥)	
taiko	leprosy	癩哥	癞哥	Hakka	thái-kô	leprosy	(癩⿸疒哥)	
taipan	conglomerate	大班	大班	Cantonese	daai6 baan1	tai-pan		
takwa	Chinese long gown	大褂	大褂	Min Nan	tā-kòa	Chinese long gown	see Changshan (長衫, 长衫) or changpao (長袍, 长袍)	
tangki, teng	container	桶仔	桶仔	Min Nan	tháng-chír	small pail, bucket		
tangkue	sweetened dried melon slices	冬瓜	冬瓜	Min Nan	tang-koe, tang-koa	winter melon (Benincasa hispida)		
tanglung	lantern	燈籠	灯笼	Min Nan	teng-lang	lantern		
tangsi	barrack	團舍	团舍	Min Nan	thn̂g-sià	barrack		
taocang	pigtail, braid	頭鬃	头鬃	Min Nan	thâu-chang	hair		
taoci	fish paste	豆豉	豆豉	Min Nan	tāu-sīⁿ, tāu-sī	douchi	douchi, a food product made from salted, fermented black soybeans	
taoco, tauco	preserved food from bean, salted	豆醬	豆酱	Min Nan	tāu-chiòⁿ	tauco		
taoge, tauge, toge	bean sprout	豆芽	豆芽	Min Nan	tāu-gê tāu-gêe	bean sprout		
taosi	douchi	豆豉	豆豉	Min Nan	tāu-sīⁿ, tāu-sī	douchi	douchi, a food product made from salted, fermented black soybeans	
tauke, taoke, toke	business owner, boss	頭家	头家	Min Nan	thâu-ke	business owner, boss		
teh	tea	茶	茶	Min Nan	tê	tea		
teko	tea pot	茶鈷	茶钴	Min Nan	tê-kó͘, têe-kó͘	teapot		
tekoh	person in charge in store	大哥	大哥	Min Nan	tōa-ko	1. eldest brother, 2. a term of address		
tekoan	tea pot	茶罐	茶罐	Min Nan	tê-kuàn	earthenware tea pot		
tekong	helmsman	舵舟	舵舟	Min Nan	tō-chiu	helmsman		
tekpi, tikpi	tekpi, short-handled trident	雙短鞭 鐵鞭	双短鞭 铁鞭	Min Nan	pian-té-piⁿ thih-piⁿ	double short whip/weapon iron whip, chain whip		
tekwan	a kind of fish soup from Palembang, Indonesia	台丸	台丸	Min Nan	tâi-oân	tower, stage, platform + round	homophonically similar to Taiwan (Chinese: 台灣; Pe̍h-ōe-jī: Tâi-oân)	
teng	Chinese lantern	燈	灯	Min Nan	teng	lamp, light, lantern		
tengkoh	prepared opium	燈膏	燈膏	Min Nan	teng-ko, ko͘, kō	lamp, light, lantern + to apply		
teyan	fundrising	題捐	题捐	Min Nan	tê-iân, tôe-iân	to collect donations		
tiam	blow, hit, stroke	點	点	Min Nan	tiám	to point, dot, place		
tiap	key money	帖	帖	Min Nan	thiap	note, dose, submission		
tim	to stew by cooking in a covered pot	燖	𬊈	Min Nan	tīm	to re-heay food		
ting	lantern	燈		Min Nan	teng	lantern		
Tionghoa	Chinese	中華	中华	Min Nan	tiong-hôa	Chinese		
Tiongkok	China	中國	中国	Min Nan	tiong-kok	China		
to	Taoist	道	道	Min Nan	tō	way, path, road		
to	to go bankrupt	倒	倒	Min Nan	tó, tó͘, táu, tho̍h	to go bankrupt, to close down		
Toapekong, tohkong	1. Chinese god who worshiped in the temple, 2. Chinese temple	大道公	大道公	Min Nan	Tāi-tō-kong	Baosheng Dadi, a Chinese god.		
tobang	cook	廚房	厨房	Min Nan	tû-pâng	kitchen		
toh	birthmark							
toko	shop	土庫	土库	Min Nan	thó͘-khò͘	local storehouse		
tokwi	altar covering	桌幃	桌帏	Min Nan				
tong	barrel	桶	桶	Min Nan	thóng	pail, bucket		
tongcai	salted vegetable	通菜	通菜	Min Nan	thong-chhài	water spinach		
tongcai	salted vegetable	通菜	通菜	Mandarin	tōngcài	water spinach		
tongkang	barge	艟舡		Min Nan	tông-kang			
tongsan	to go home	唐山	唐山	Min Nan	tn̂g-soaⁿ	(mainland) China, Tang mountain, Tangshan		
tongsit	hair bun	唐式	唐式	Min Nan	tn̂g-sit	Tang (China) + model, fashion		
topeng	mask	倒反	倒反	Min Nan	tò-péng	another side		
topo	rag, cloth used for cleaning	桌布	桌布	Min Nan	toh-pò͘	tablecloth		
toya	long stick (weapon)	槌仔	槌仔	Min Nan	thûi-á			
tui	to gamble	賭	赌	Min Nan	tó͘	to gamble		
tui	to do again, false start	轉	转	Min Nan	tó͘	to return		
tukang	1. craftsmaster, expert person, 2. a rough person	土工	土工	Min Nan	thó͘-kang	construction worker		
tun	rupiah as 1 rupiah, 100 rupiah	盾	盾	Min Nan	tún, tún	1. shield, 2. money	money in this case refers to đồng, guilder; gulden, or rupiah	

=== U ===
Indonesian Word	Indonesian Meaning	Chinese Character (Traditional)	Chinese Character (Simplified)	Chinese Variant	Chinese Transliteration	Chinese Meaning	Note	Ref
uang	money	環	环	Hakka	vàn	circle, ring, round		
uang	money	環	环	Min Nan	hoân	circle, ring, round		
ubin	floortile	油面	油面	Min Nan	iû-bin	to paint + surface		
ungti	giant puppet (ondel-ondel)	像體	像体	Min Nan	siōng-thé	statue + body		

=== V ===
Indonesian Word	Indonesian Meaning	Chinese Character (Traditional)	Chinese Character (Simplified)	Chinese Variant	Chinese Transliteration	Chinese Meaning	Note	Ref
vetsin, micin, pécin	glutamate flavoring	味精	味精	Mandarin	wèijīng	1. glutamate flavoring, 2. Ve-Tsin, glutamate flavoring product from Tien Chun		
vetsin, micin, pécin	glutamate flavoring	味精	味精	Cantonese	mei6 zing1	1. glutamate flavoring, 2. Ve-Tsin, glutamate flavoring product from Tien Chun		
vetsin, micin, pécin	glutamate flavoring	味精	味精	Hakka	mi-chîn	1. glutamate flavoring, 2. Ve-Tsin, glutamate flavoring product from Tien Chun		

=== W ===
Indonesian Word	Indonesian Meaning	Chinese Character (Traditional)	Chinese Character (Simplified)	Chinese Variant	Chinese Transliteration	Chinese Meaning	Note	Ref
waitangkung	a gymnastics	外丹功	外丹功	Mandarin	wàidāngōng			
wangkang	canoe	艋舺	艋舺	Min Nan	báng-kah	outrigger canoe	disputed, considered a loanword to Chinese from Austronesian (which included Indonesian)	
woi	hey, hello	喂	喂	Cantonese	wai2		disputed, derived from various languages	
woi	hey, hello	喂	喂	Min Nan	oeh		disputed, derived from various languages	
wotie, kuotie	fried jiaozi	鍋貼	锅贴	Min Nan	oe-thiap, ko-thiap	fried jiaozi		
wushu	wushu	武術	武术	Mandarin	wǔshù	martial art, wushu		

=== Y ===
Indonesian Word	Indonesian Meaning	Chinese Character (Traditional)	Chinese Character (Simplified)	Chinese Variant	Chinese Transliteration	Chinese Meaning	Note	Ref
yang	yang	陽	阳	Mandarin	yáng	yang		
yin	yin	陰	阴	Mandarin	yīn	yin		

== Bibliography ==
- Badudu, J.S; Kamus Kata-kata Serapan Asing Dalam Bahasa Indonesia; Kompas, Jakarta, 2003
- Kamus Besar Bahasa Indonesia, Departemen Pendidikan dan Kebudayaan, Jakarta, Balai Pustaka: 1999, halaman 1185 s.d. 1188 berisikan Pendahuluan buku Senarai Kata Serapan dalam Bahasa Indonesia, Departemen Pendidikan dan Kebudayaan, Jakarta, 1996 (dengan sedikit penyaduran tanpa mengubah maksud dan tujuan seseungguhnya dari buku ini).
