= Stephania crebra =

Scientific classification
- Kingdom: Plantae
- Clade: Tracheophytes
- Clade: Angiosperms
- Clade: Eudicots
- Order: Ranunculales
- Family: Menispermaceae
- Genus: Stephania
- Species: S. crebra

Binomial name
- Stephania crebra Forman

Species of plant

Stephania crebra is a herbaceous perennial vine in the genus Stephania of the family Menispermaceae. It is native to Southeast Asia and was first described in Thailand in 1988 by L. L. Forman. It is one of 15 Stephania found only in northern Thailand, specifically in the province of Chiang Mai. It has leaves 12–17 cm (4.7–6.7 in) long and 9–16 cm (3.5–6.3 in) wide. It resembles Stephania reticulata but S. crebra has larger flowers but smaller drupes and endocarps.

== See also ==
- Chinese herbology: 50 fundamental herbs
