= 涼粉 =

涼粉 may refer to:

- Grass jelly, a jelly-like dessert eaten in East Asia
- Liangfen, a Chinese dish that consists of starch jelly
- Platostoma palustre, a plant species used in making grass jelly
