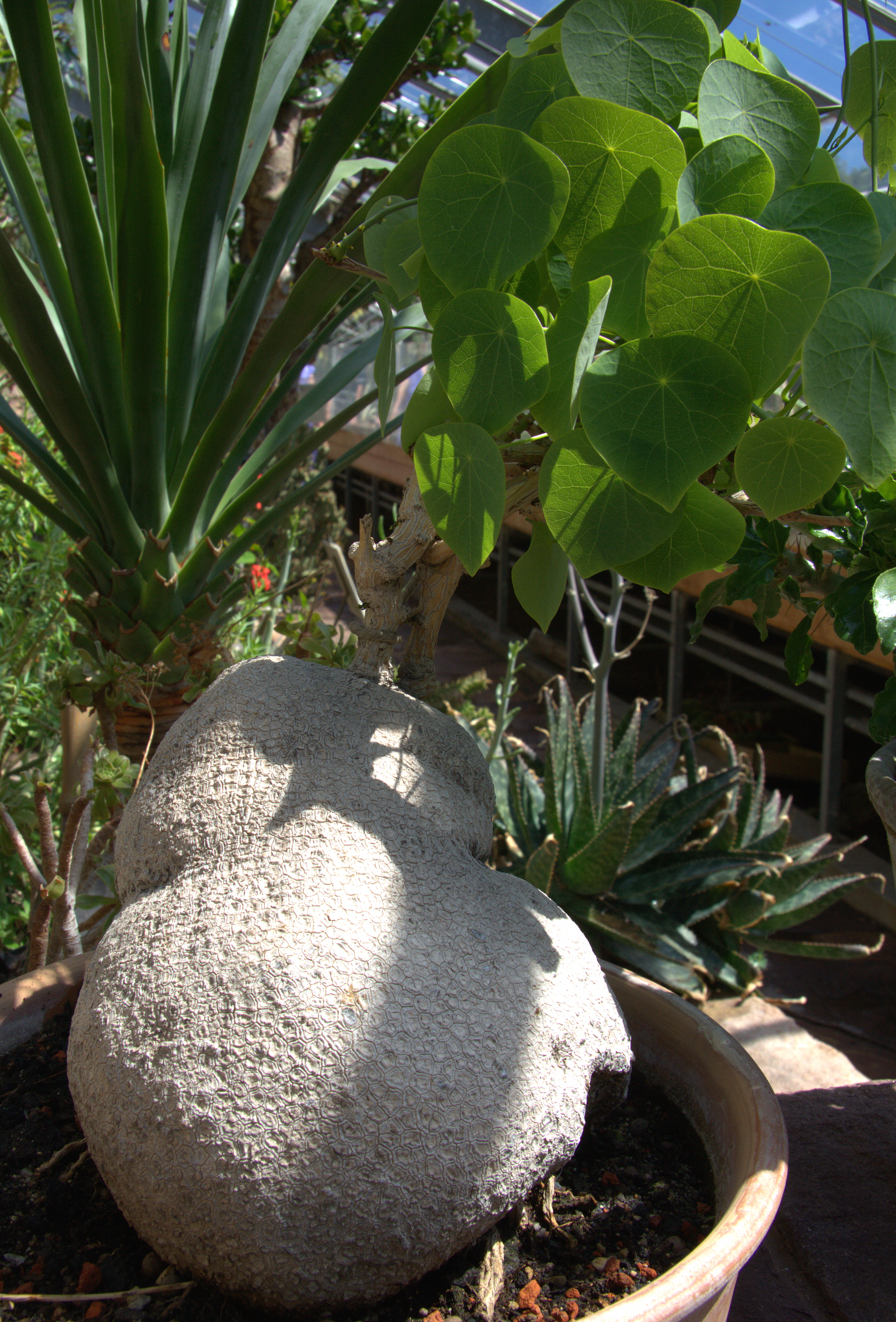

Scientific classification
- Kingdom: Plantae
- Clade: Tracheophytes
- Clade: Angiosperms
- Clade: Eudicots
- Order: Ranunculales
- Family: Menispermaceae
- Genus: Stephania
- Species: S. suberosa

Binomial name
- Stephania suberosa Forman

= Stephania suberosa =

Species of flowering plant

Stephania suberosa is a shrub native to Thailand and Cambodia, described by Lewis Leonard Forman in 1980.
