= Cepharanoline =

Names
- IUPAC name (14S,27R)-33-Methoxy-13,28-dimethyl-2,5,7,20-tetraoxa-13,28-diazaoctacyclo[25.6.2.2^{16,19}.1^{3,10}.1^{21,25}.0^{4,8}.0^{14,39}.0^{31,35}]nonatriaconta-1(33),3,8,10(39),16,18,21(36),22,24,31,34,37-dodecaen-22-ol

Identifiers
CAS Number	27686-34-6
3D model (JSmol)	Interactive image
ChemSpider	4475003
PubChem CID	5315779
CompTox Dashboard (EPA)	DTXSID201045590
- InChI: InChI=1S/C36H36N2O6/c1-37-12-10-23-17-31(40-3)32-19-26(23)27(37)15-22-6-9-29(39)30(16-22)43-25-7-4-21(5-8-25)14-28-34-24(11-13-38(28)2)18-33-35(36(34)44-32)42-20-41-33/h4-9,16-19,27-28,39H,10-15,20H2,1-3H3/t27-,28+/m1/s1 Key: VQAWRQZAAIQXHM-IZLXSDGUSA-N; InChI=1/C36H36N2O6/c1-37-12-10-23-17-31(40-3)32-19-26(23)27(37)15-22-6-9-29(39)30(16-22)43-25-7-4-21(5-8-25)14-28-34-24(11-13-38(28)2)18-33-35(36(34)44-32)42-20-41-33/h4-9,16-19,27-28,39H,10-15,20H2,1-3H3/t27-,28+/m1/s1 Key: VQAWRQZAAIQXHM-IZLXSDGUBD
- SMILES: CN1CCC2=CC3=C(C4=C2[C@@H]1CC5=CC=C(C=C5)OC6=C(C=CC(=C6)C[C@@H]7C8=CC(=C(C=C8CCN7C)OC)O4)O)OCO3

Properties
Chemical formula	C_{36}N_{2}O_{6}
Molar mass	556.404 g·mol^{−1}
- Except where otherwise noted, data are given for materials in their standard state (at 25 °C [77 °F], 100 kPa). Infobox references

Cepharanoline is an isolate of Stephania that has antiplasmodial activity with an IC_{50} of 0.2 μM.
