= Stephania tomentella =

Scientific classification
- Kingdom: Plantae
- Clade: Tracheophytes
- Clade: Angiosperms
- Clade: Eudicots
- Order: Ranunculales
- Family: Menispermaceae
- Genus: Stephania
- Species: S. tomentella

Binomial name
- Stephania tomentella Forman

Species of plant

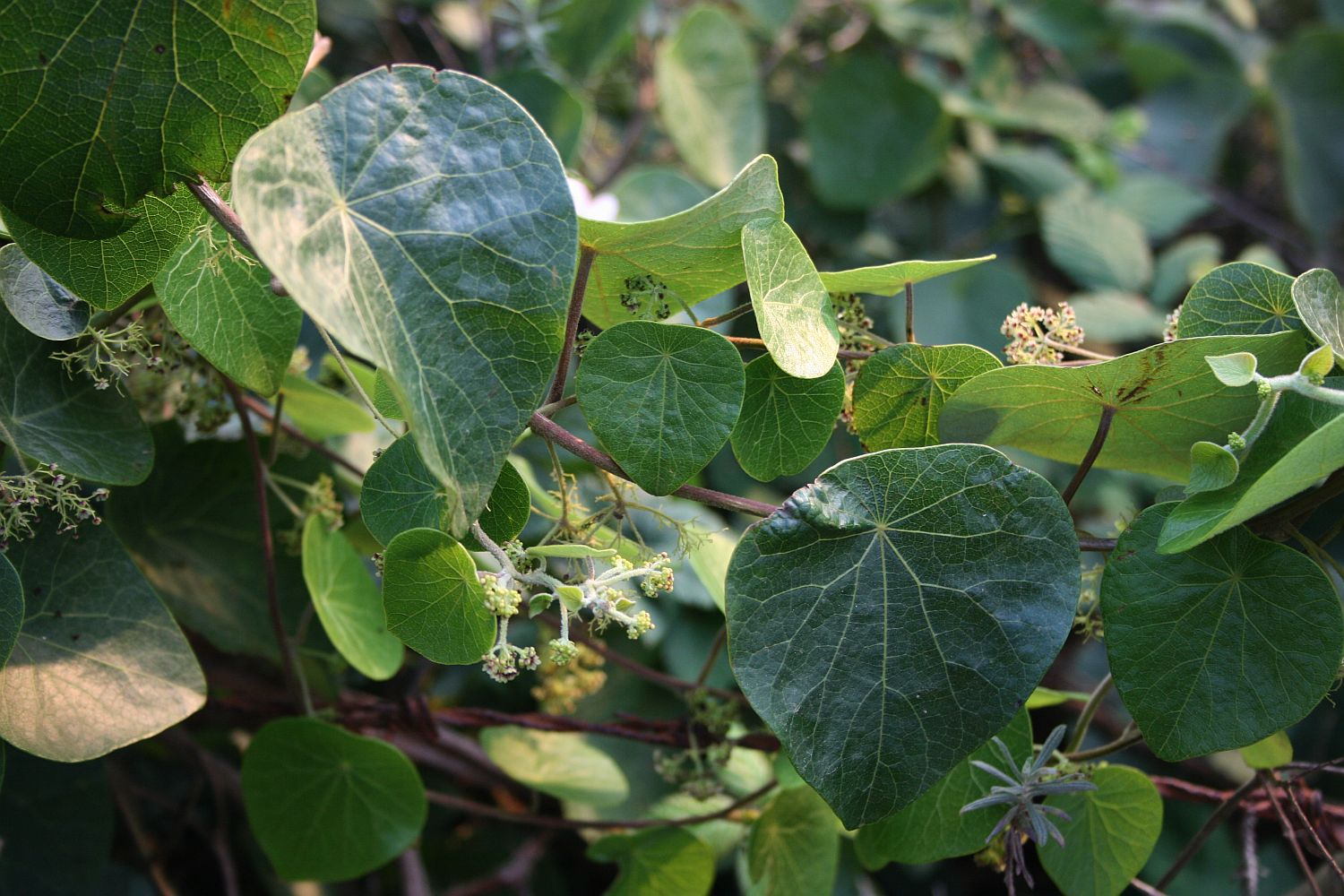
Stephania abyssinica var. tomentella

Stephania tomentella is a herbaceous perennial vine of the family Menispermaceae and genus Stephania. It is native to Southeast Asia and was first described in Thailand in 1988 by L. L. Forman. It is one of 15 Stephania found only in northern Thailand, specifically in the area around Chiang Rai. It has leaves measuring 7–9 cm (2.8–3.5 in) in both width and length. It is commonly found amongst limestone rocks.
