= S. reticulata =

S. reticulata may refer to:

- Salix reticulata, the net-leaved willow, a dwarf willow species occurring in the colder parts of Northern Europe, Greenland, North America and Northern Asia
- Scenella reticulata, an extinct mollusc species from the Early Cambrian–Middle Ordovician
- Schistura reticulata, a ray-finned fish species
- Senna reticulata, the mangerioba grande or maria mole, a plant species found in South America
- Sideridis reticulata, the bordered gothic, a moth species found in the Palearctic ecozone
- Stephania reticulata, a flowering plant species native to eastern and southern Asia and Australasia
- Syringa reticulata, the Japanese tree lilac, a plant species native to eastern Asia
