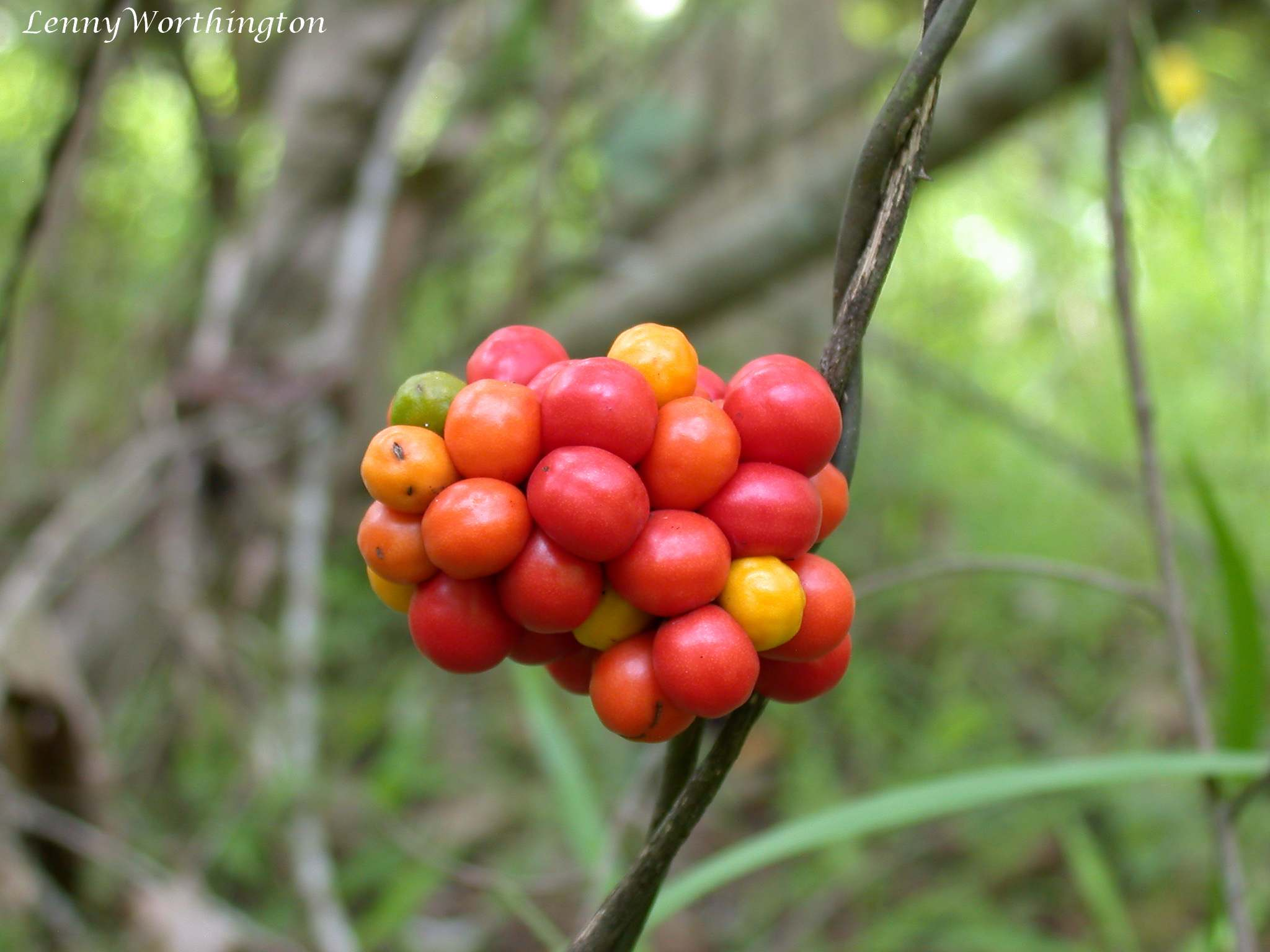

Scientific classification
- Kingdom: Plantae
- Clade: Tracheophytes
- Clade: Angiosperms
- Clade: Eudicots
- Order: Ranunculales
- Family: Menispermaceae
- Genus: Stephania
- Species: S. capitata

Binomial name
- Stephania capitata (Blume) Spreng.

Synonyms
- Stephania truncata Yamamoto; Stephania obvia Miers; Stephania longifolia Becc. Stephania acuminatissima Walp. Stephania acuminata Spreng. Clypea capitata Blume; Clypea acuminatissima Blume

= Stephania capitata =

Species of flowering plant

Stephania capitata also known as sumbat kendi or vase plug in Indonesian is a medicinal plant that was commonly used as a substitute of Cyclea barbata to produce green grass jelly.

Stephanine [517-63-5] is an aporphine alkaloid that occurs in Stephania capitata Spreng and also S. japonica.
