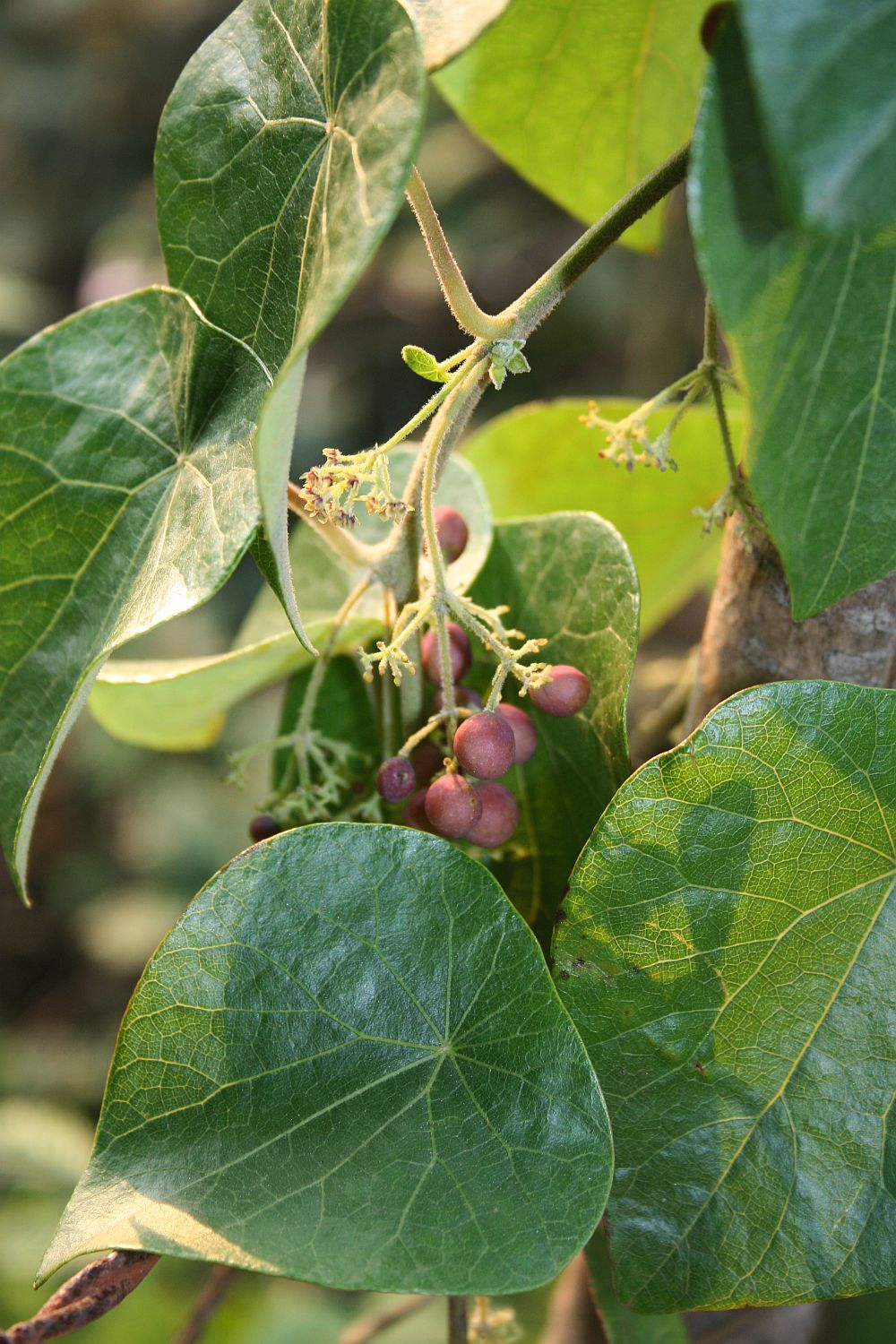

Scientific classification
- Kingdom: Plantae
- Clade: Tracheophytes
- Clade: Angiosperms
- Clade: Eudicots
- Order: Ranunculales
- Family: Menispermaceae
- Genus: Stephania
- Species: S. abyssinica

Binomial name
- Stephania abyssinica (Dill. & A. Rich.) Walp.

= Stephania abyssinica =

Species of flowering plant

Stephania abyssinica is a species of vine native to southern Africa. it is the only member of its genus found in the region. Two subspecies are recognised.
