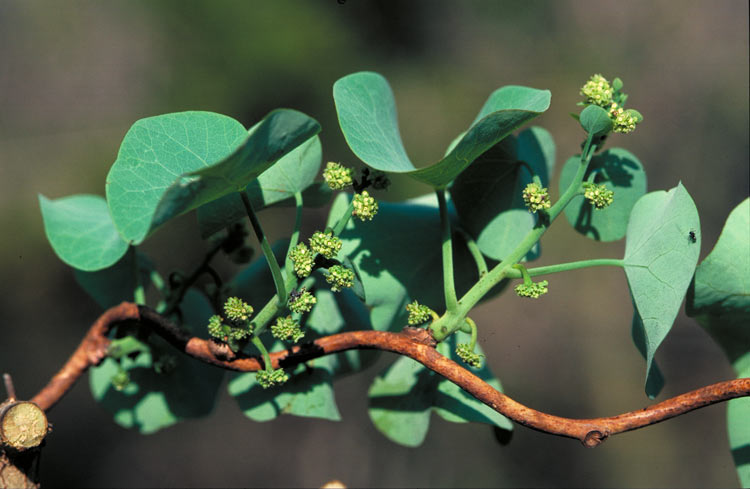
- Vine stem with flowers

Conservation status
- Least Concern (NCA)

Scientific classification
- Kingdom: Plantae
- Clade: Embryophytes
- Clade: Tracheophytes
- Clade: Angiosperms
- Clade: Eudicots
- Order: Ranunculales
- Family: Menispermaceae
- Genus: Stephania
- Species: S. bancroftii

Binomial name
- Stephania bancroftii F.M.Bailey

= Stephania bancroftii =

Species of flowering plant

Stephania bancroftii is a species of plant in the family Menispermaceae. It is native to Queensland, Australia, where it is known from only a handful of collections. It was first described in 1910 by botanist Frederick Manson Bailey.

== Description ==
Stephania bancroftii is a tuberous climber with a stem diameter of up to 4 cm (1.6 in). The tuber is sub-globose and grows up to about 25 cm (9.8 in) diameter. The leaves are broadly ovate, and the petiole attaches to the leaf blade on the underside (i.e. it is peltate) more or less centrally. The leaves can reach 13 cm (5.1 in) in length and 14 cm (5.5 in) width, and the petiole may be up to 14 cm long.

The flowers occur in dense clusters or 'heads'. Individual flowers are quite small—petals on the male flowers are about 0.6 mm (0.02 in) long and those on the female flowers are about 1 mm (0.04 in) long. This species is dioecious, meaning that pistillate (functionally female) and staminate (functionally male) flowers are borne on separate plants. The fruit is a yellow, orange or red drupe about 8 mm (0.3 in) long and wide, containing a single seed.

=== Phenology ===
Flowering occurs from November to January, fruit have been collected in January.

== Distribution and habitat ==
The species grows in open forest, vine thickets and monsoon forest, at altitudes from sea level to about 800 m (2,600 ft), and ranges from the Cairns region to the area around Rockhampton.
