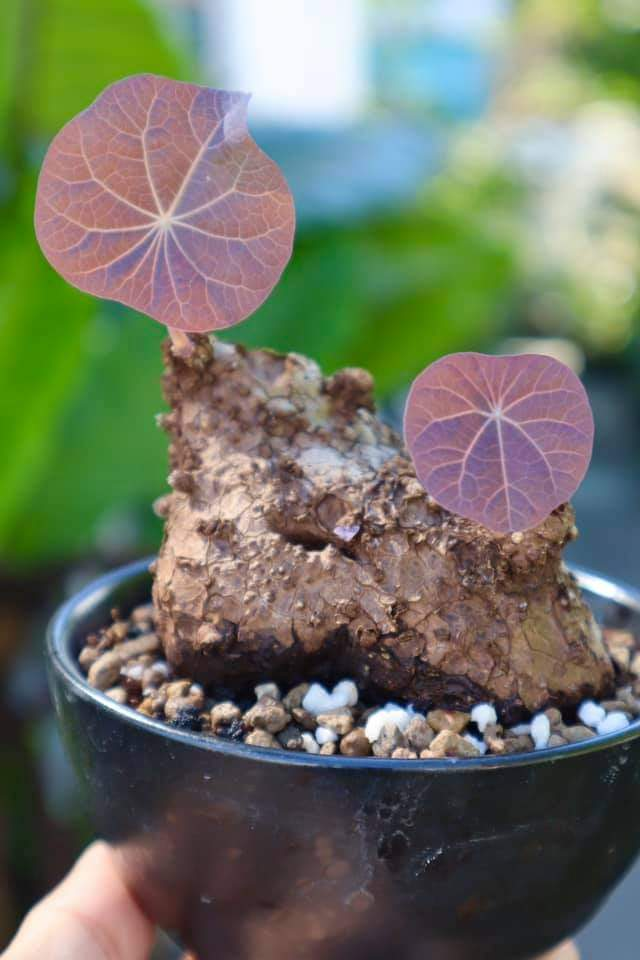

Scientific classification
- Kingdom: Plantae
- Clade: Tracheophytes
- Clade: Angiosperms
- Clade: Eudicots
- Order: Ranunculales
- Family: Menispermaceae
- Genus: Stephania
- Species: S. kaweesakii

Binomial name
- Stephania kaweesakii Jenjitt. & Ruchis.

= Stephania kaweesakii =

Species of plant

Stephania kaweesakii is a herbaceous perennial vine in the genus Stephania of the family Menispermaceae. It is native to Southeast Asia and was first described in Thailand in 2020 by Thai botanists Thaya Jenjittikul and Saroj Ruchisansakun.
