= Stephania tuberosa =

Pumpkin vine

Conservation status
- Least Concern (NCA)

Scientific classification
- Kingdom: Plantae
- Clade: Embryophytes
- Clade: Tracheophytes
- Clade: Spermatophytes
- Clade: Angiosperms
- Clade: Eudicots
- Order: Ranunculales
- Family: Menispermaceae
- Genus: Stephania
- Species: S. tuberosa

Binomial name
- Stephania tuberosa Forman

Synonyms
- Stephania sp. (Bamaga LSS AQ170418)

Species of flowering plant

Stephania tuberosa is a plant in the family Menispermaceae which is endemic to Queensland. It grows as a vine with a stem diameter of up to 5 cm (2.0 in) and produces a distinctive large tuber on the ground which can be up to 50 cm (20 in) diameter.

== Conservation ==
This species is listed by the Queensland Department of Environment and Science as least concern. As of 8 November 2021, it has not been assessed by the IUCN.
