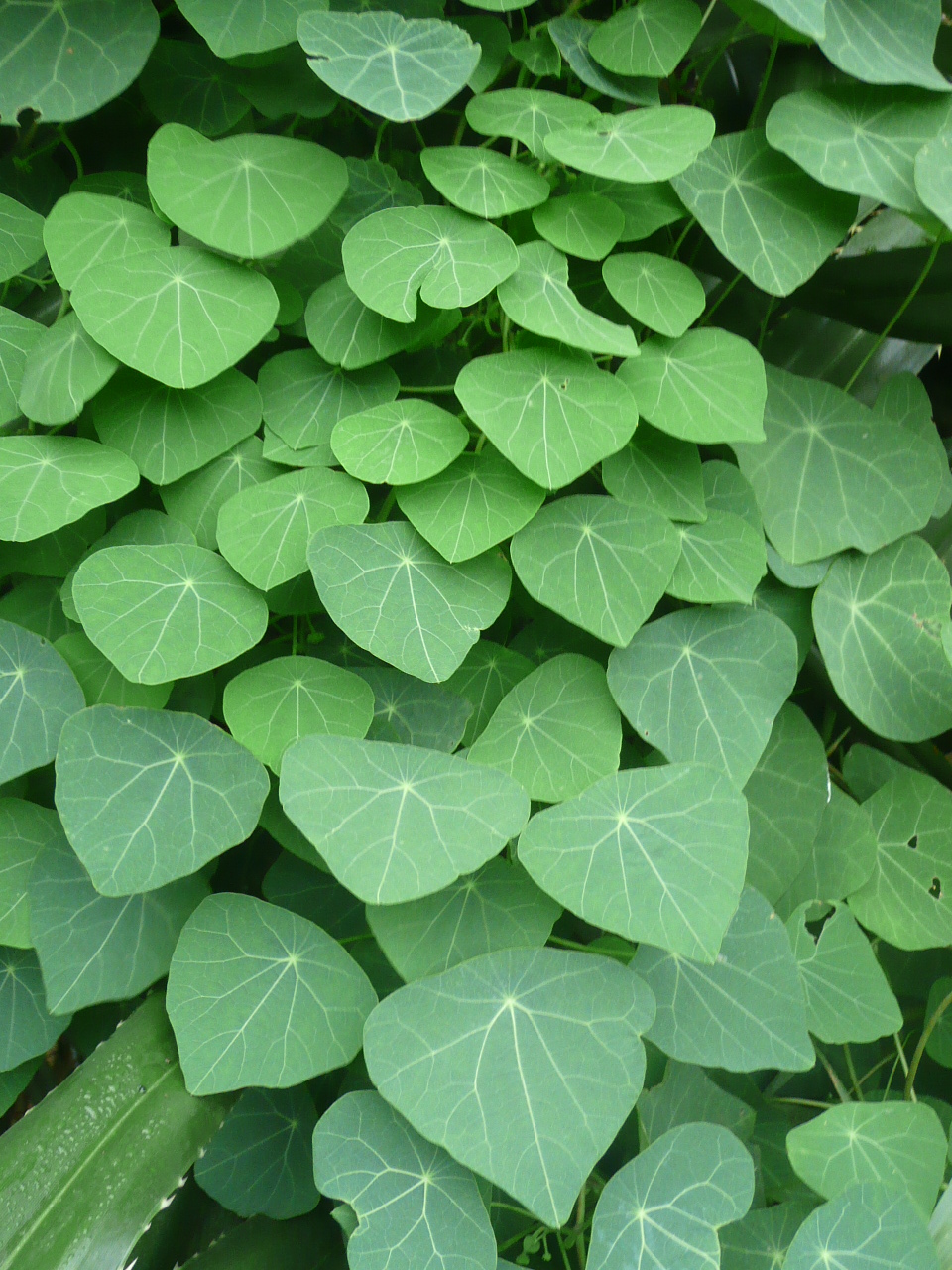

Scientific classification
- Kingdom: Plantae
- Clade: Tracheophytes
- Clade: Angiosperms
- Clade: Eudicots
- Order: Ranunculales
- Family: Menispermaceae
- Genus: Stephania
- Species: S. cephalantha

Binomial name
- Stephania cephalantha Hayata

Synonyms
- Stephania disciflora Hand.-Mazz.

= Stephania cephalantha =

Species of plant

Stephania cephalantha is a plant in the genus Stephania of the family Menispermaceae native to China, Taiwan and Vietnam. It is usually found in temperate climates.
