= Stephania pierrei =

Scientific classification
- Kingdom: Plantae
- Clade: Tracheophytes
- Clade: Angiosperms
- Clade: Eudicots
- Order: Ranunculales
- Family: Menispermaceae
- Genus: Stephania
- Species: S. pierrei

Binomial name
- Stephania pierrei Diels

Synonyms
- Stephania erecta Craib

Species of plant

Stephania pierrei, commonly known as binh voi in Vietnam, is a vine native to Cambodia, Laos, Thailand and Vietnam. It was first described by Ludwig Diels in 1910.

== Description ==
Stephania pierrei is an herbaceous perennial vine with a woody caudex (a swollen stem, in this case superficially resembling a potato) that can grow up to 20 cm (7.9 in) in diameter, occasionally to 25 cm. It sprouts long vines up to 8 m (26 ft) long with small circular leaves with intricate mosaic veining. It sprouts in spring, first with yellow flowers, followed by its foliage. The foliage can go dormant in winter.

== Distribution and habitat ==
The native range of this plant is Cambodia, Laos, Thailand and Vietnam. It inhabits evergreen and deciduous forest as well as open land and shrubland.

== Conservation ==
The 2006 Vietnam Red List of Medicinal Plants lists Stephania pierrei as a vulnerable species within the country.

== Uses ==
The root or caudex is used as a traditional medicine in Vietnam and Cambodia to treat ailments such as fluid retention, heart disease and migraines, and it may also have uses against malaria and cancers. The leaves are an ingredient in some food dishes.

== Cultivation ==
It is a popular collector houseplant.
