= Stephania reticulata =

Scientific classification
- Kingdom: Plantae
- Clade: Tracheophytes
- Clade: Angiosperms
- Clade: Eudicots
- Order: Ranunculales
- Family: Menispermaceae
- Genus: Stephania
- Species: S. reticulata

Binomial name
- Stephania reticulata Forman

Species of flowering plant

Stephania reticulata is a shrub native to Myanmar, Thailand, Laos, Borneo and Java. It was described by Lewis Leonard Forman in 1956.
