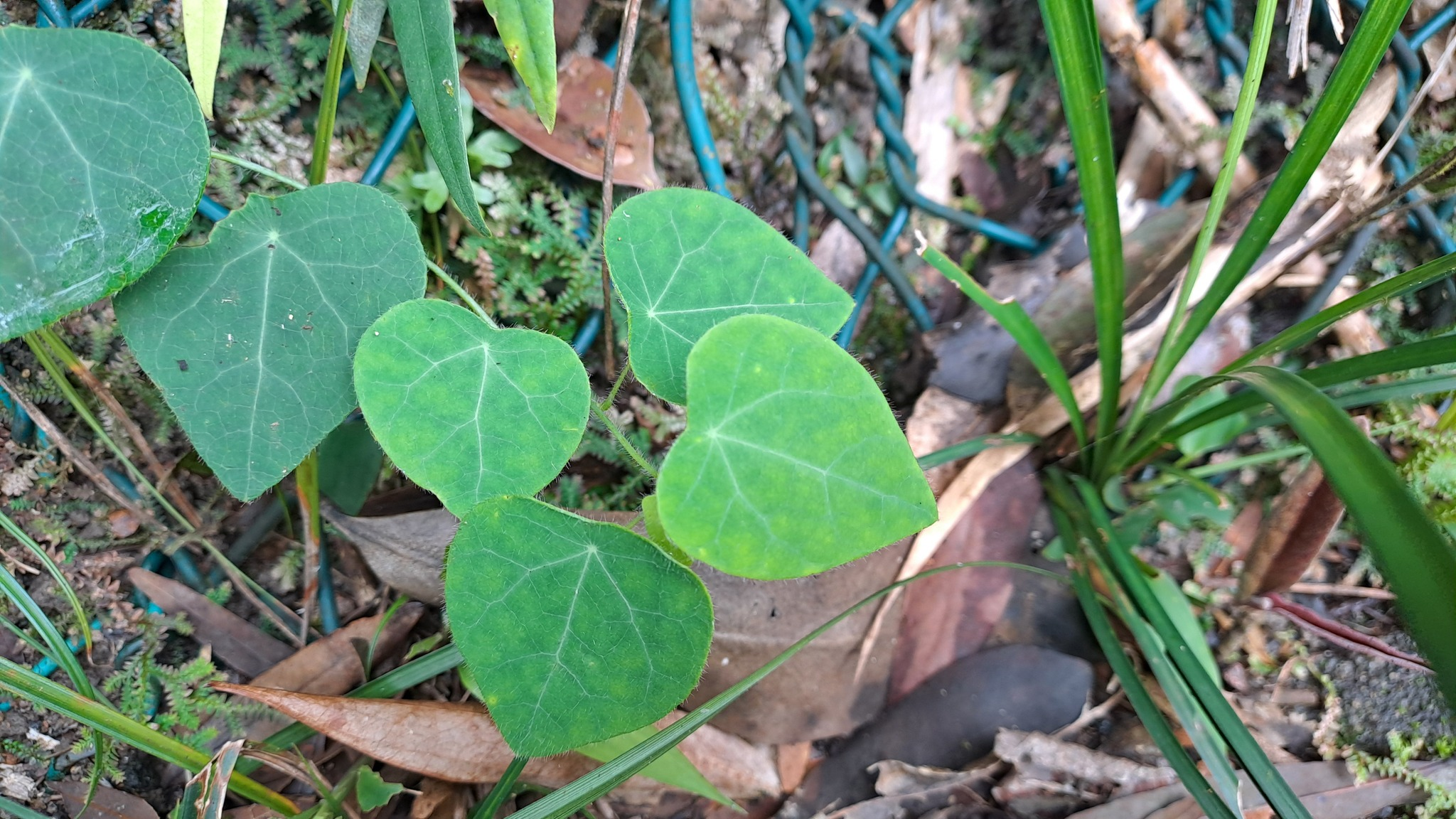

Scientific classification
- Kingdom: Plantae
- Clade: Tracheophytes
- Clade: Angiosperms
- Clade: Eudicots
- Order: Ranunculales
- Family: Menispermaceae
- Genus: Cyclea
- Species: C. barbata

Binomial name
- Cyclea barbata John Miers

Synonyms
- Heterotypic Synonyms: Cyclea ciliata Craib; Cyclea wallichii Diels

= Cyclea barbata =

Species of flowering plant

Cyclea barbata is a species of flowering plants in the family Menispermaceae.

== Distribution and habitat ==
It is native to the Andaman Islands, Assam, Bangladesh, Cambodia, southeast China, the Eastern Himalayas, Hainan, Java, Laos, the Lesser Sunda Islands, Myanmar, the Nicobar Islands, South China Sea, Sumatra, Thailand, and Vietnam.

== Uses ==
It is used as a medicinal plant in Java to treat a variety of ailments including stomach ache and fever. Prepartions include making green grass jelly from the leaves, or an infusion from the roots.
