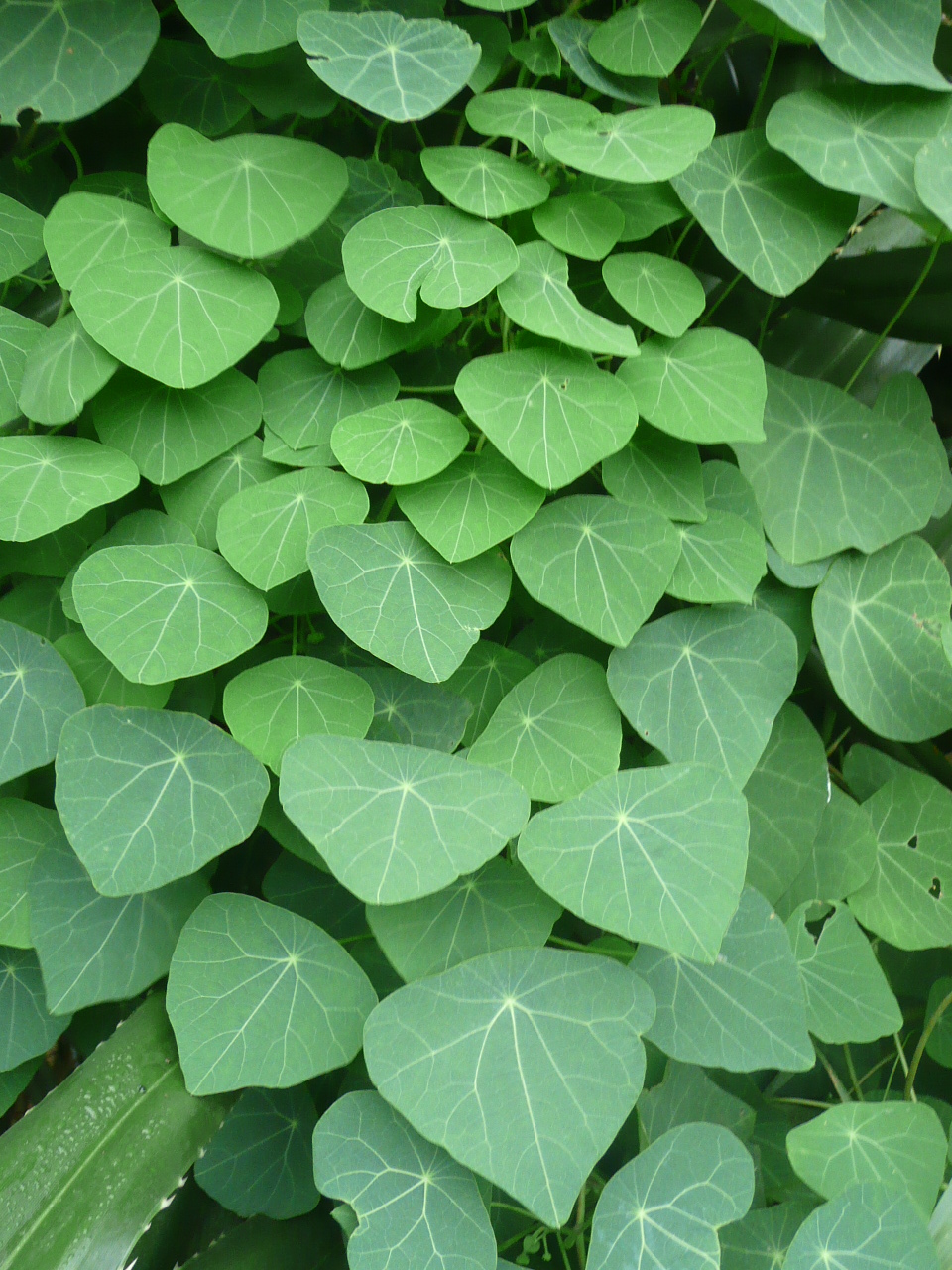
- Stephania cephalantha

Scientific classification
- Kingdom: Plantae
- Clade: Embryophytes
- Clade: Tracheophytes
- Clade: Spermatophytes
- Clade: Angiosperms
- Clade: Eudicots
- Order: Ranunculales
- Family: Menispermaceae
- Subfamily: Menispermoideae
- Genus: Stephania; Lour.

Type species
- Stephania rotunda Lour.

Synonyms
- Byrsa Noronha; Clypea Blume; Homocnemia Miers; Ileocarpus Miers

= Stephania =

Genus of plants

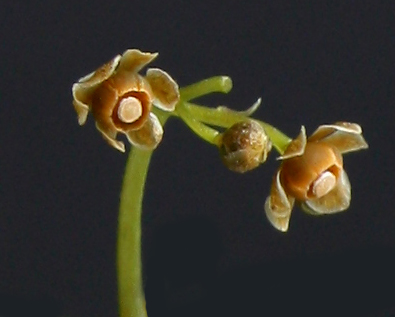
Female flowers of Stephania delavayi

Stephania is a genus of flowering plants in the family Menispermaceae. It includes 70 species native to tropical and southern Africa, eastern and southern Asia, Australia, and the tropical Pacific Islands. They are herbaceous perennial vines, growing to around four metres tall, with a large tuber. The leaves are arranged spirally on the stem and are peltate, with the leaf petiole attached near the centre of the leaf. The name Stephania comes from the Greek word for 'crown'. It refers to the anthers being arranged in a crown-like manner.

== Species ==
As of May 2026, Plants of the World Online accepts the following 70 species:

- Stephania abyssinica (Quart.-Dill. & A.Rich.) Walp.
- Stephania andamanica Diels
- Stephania bancroftii F.M.Bailey
- Stephania brachyandra Diels
- Stephania brevipedunculata C.Y.Wu & D.D.Tao
- Stephania brevipes Craib
- Stephania cambodica Gagnep.
- Stephania capitata (Blume) Spreng.
- Stephania cephalantha Hayata
- Stephania chingtungensis H.S.Lo
- Stephania corymbosa (Blume) Walp.
- Stephania crebra Forman
- Stephania cyanantha Welw. ex Hiern
- Stephania delavayi Diels
- Stephania dentifolia H.S.Lo & M.Yang
- Stephania dicentrinifera H.S.Lo & M.Yang
- Stephania dictyoneura Diels
- Stephania dielsiana Y.C.Wu
- Stephania dinklagei (Engl.) Diels
- Stephania dolichopoda Diels
- Stephania ebracteata S.Y.Zhao & H.S.Lo
- Stephania elegans Hook.f. & Thomson
- Stephania epigaea H.S.Lo
- Stephania excentrica H.S.Lo
- Stephania formanii Kundu & S.Guha
- Stephania glandulifera Miers
- Stephania gracilenta Miers
- Stephania grandiflora Forman
- Stephania hainanensis H.S.Lo & Y.Tsoong
- Stephania herbacea Gagnep.
- Stephania intermedia H.S.Lo
- Stephania japonica (Thunb.) Miers
- Stephania kaweesakii Jenjitt. & Ruchis.
- Stephania kuinanensis H.S.Lo & M.Yang
- Stephania kwangsiensis H.S.Lo
- Stephania lincangensis H.S.Lo & M.Yang
- Stephania longa Lour.
- Stephania longipes H.S.Lo
- Stephania macrantha H.S.Lo & M.Yang
- Stephania mashanica H.S.Lo & B.N.Chang
- Stephania merrillii Diels
- Stephania micrantha H.S.Lo & M.Yang
- Stephania mildbraedii Diels
- Stephania miyiensis S.Y.Zhao & H.S.Lo
- Stephania moluccana Forman
- Stephania montana Diels
- Stephania neoguineensis Kundu & S.Guha
- Stephania novenanthera Heng C.Wang
- Stephania oblata Craib
- Stephania officinarum H.S.Lo & M.Yang
- Stephania papillosa Craib
- Stephania pierrei Diels
- Stephania polygona N.H.Xia & V.T.Chinh
- Stephania psilophylla (C.Presl) Forman
- Stephania renifolia Forman
- Stephania reticulata Forman
- Stephania rotunda Lour.
- Stephania salomonum Diels
- Stephania sinica Diels
- Stephania suberosa Forman
- Stephania subpeltata H.S.Lo
- Stephania succifera H.S.Lo & Y.Tsoong
- Stephania sutchuenensis H.S.Lo
- Stephania tomentella Forman
- Stephania tuberosa Forman
- Stephania venosa (Blume) Spreng.
- Stephania viridiflavens H.S.Lo & M.Yang
- Stephania wightii (Arn. ex Wight) Dunn
- Stephania yunnanensis H.S.Lo
- Stephania zippeliana Miq.

Fossil species

- Stephania palaeosudamericana Herrera et al.

Formerly placed here

- Stephania tetrandra S.Moore – now Botryodiscia tetrandra (S.Moore) L.Lian & Wei Wang

== Toxicity ==
There is evidence that a few species of Stephania are toxic.

== Chemistry ==
Chemical investigation of Stephania rotunda Lour. growing in Vietnam in 2005 led to the isolation and structural elucidation of three new alkaloids, 5-hydroxy-6,7-dimethoxy-3,4-dihydroisoquinolin-1(2H)-one, thaicanine 4-O-beta-D-glucoside, as well as (−)-thaicanine N-oxide (4-hydroxycorynoxidine), along with 23 known alkaloids.
