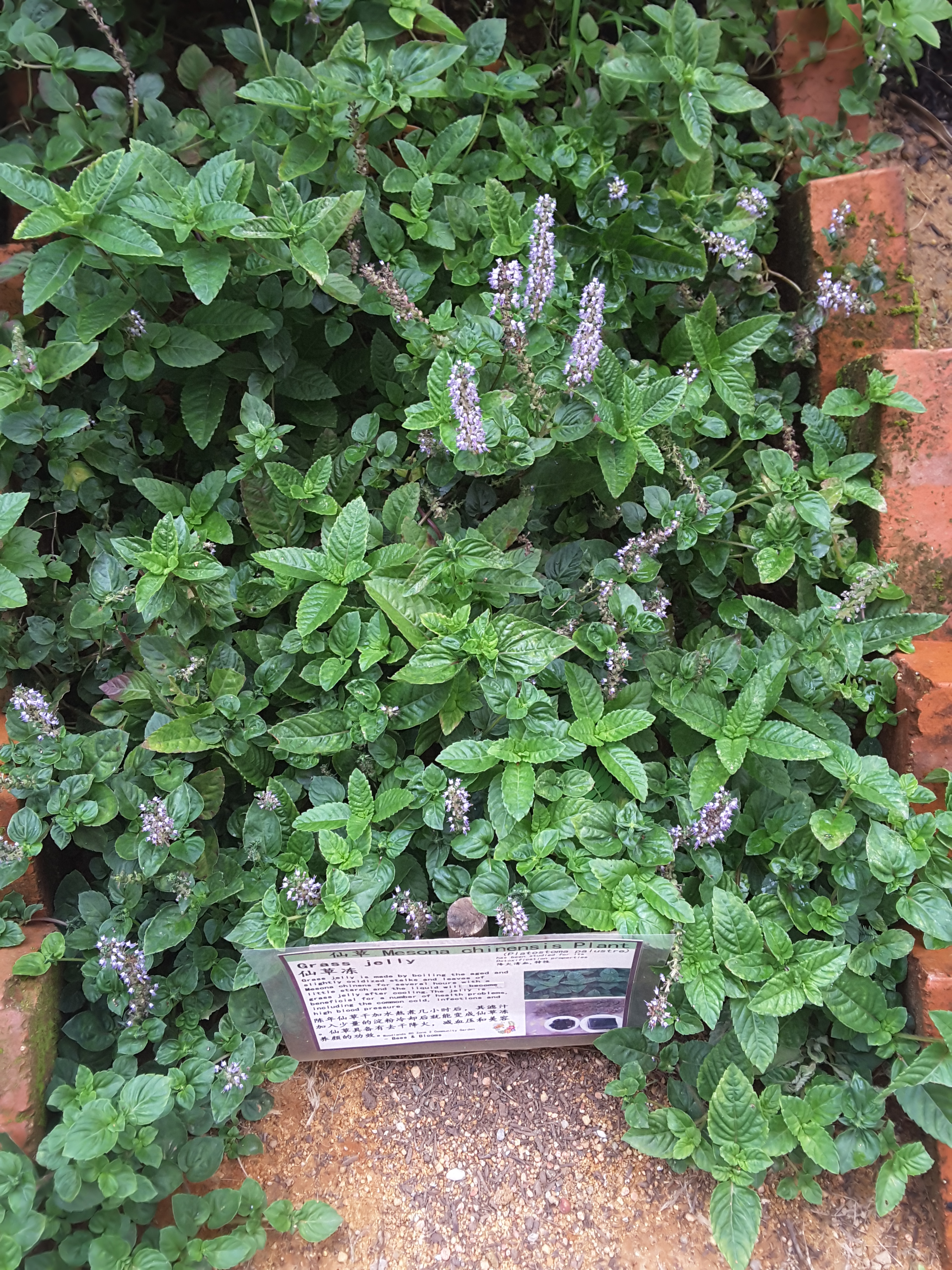

Scientific classification
- Kingdom: Plantae
- Clade: Tracheophytes
- Clade: Angiosperms
- Clade: Eudicots
- Clade: Asterids
- Order: Lamiales
- Family: Lamiaceae
- Genus: Platostoma
- Species: P. palustre

Binomial name
- Platostoma palustre (Blume) A.J.Paton, 1997

Synonyms
- Geniosporum parviflorum Benth., 1830; Mesona chinensis Benth., 1861; Mesona elegans Hayata, 1906; Mesona palustris Blume, 1826; Mesona parviflora (Benth.) Briq., 1897; Mesona philippinensis Merr., 1912; Mesona procumbens Hemsl., 1895; Mesona wallichiana Benth., 1848 [Illegitimate]; Platostoma chinense (Benth.) A.J.Paton, 1997

= Platostoma palustre =

Species of flowering plant

Platostoma palustre, commonly known as Chinese mesona, is a species of plant belonging to the genus Platostoma of the mint family. The species grows extensively in East Asia such as south east China, Japan and Taiwan preferring ravines, grassy, dry, and sandy areas. The plants are from 15 to 100 cm high with hairy stems and leaves. The leaves are tear-drop shaped and serrated.

The plants are referred to as xiān cǎo (仙草), xiānrén cǎo (仙人草), xiān cǎo jiù (仙草舅) or liángfěn cǎo (涼粉草) in Mandarin Chinese, sian-chháu (仙草) in Taiwanese, lèuhng fán chou (涼粉草) in Cantonese, sương sáo in Vietnamese, and ya chaokuai (หญ้าเฉาก๊วย) in Thai.

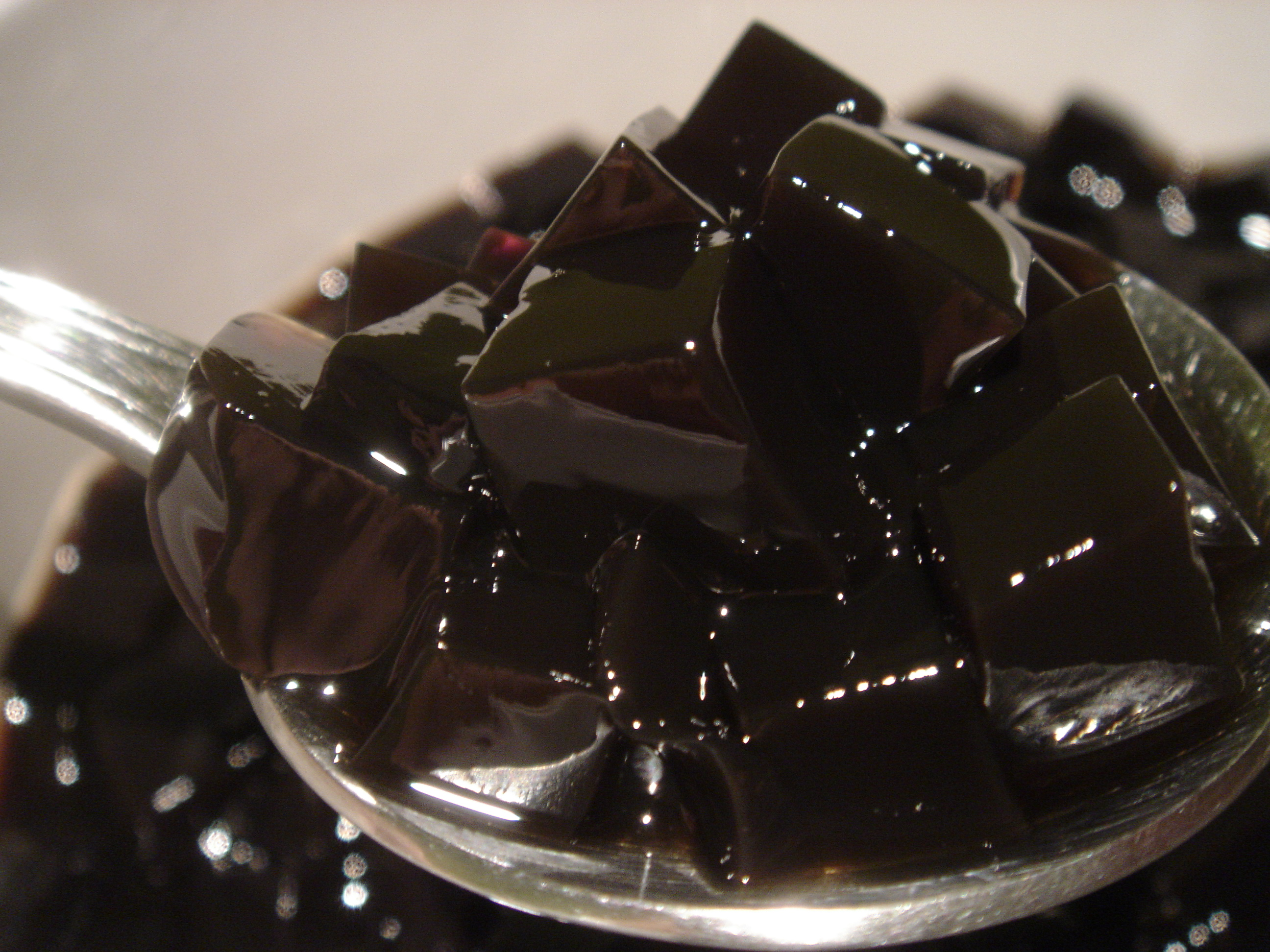
Cut grass jelly

== Use, cultivation and processing ==
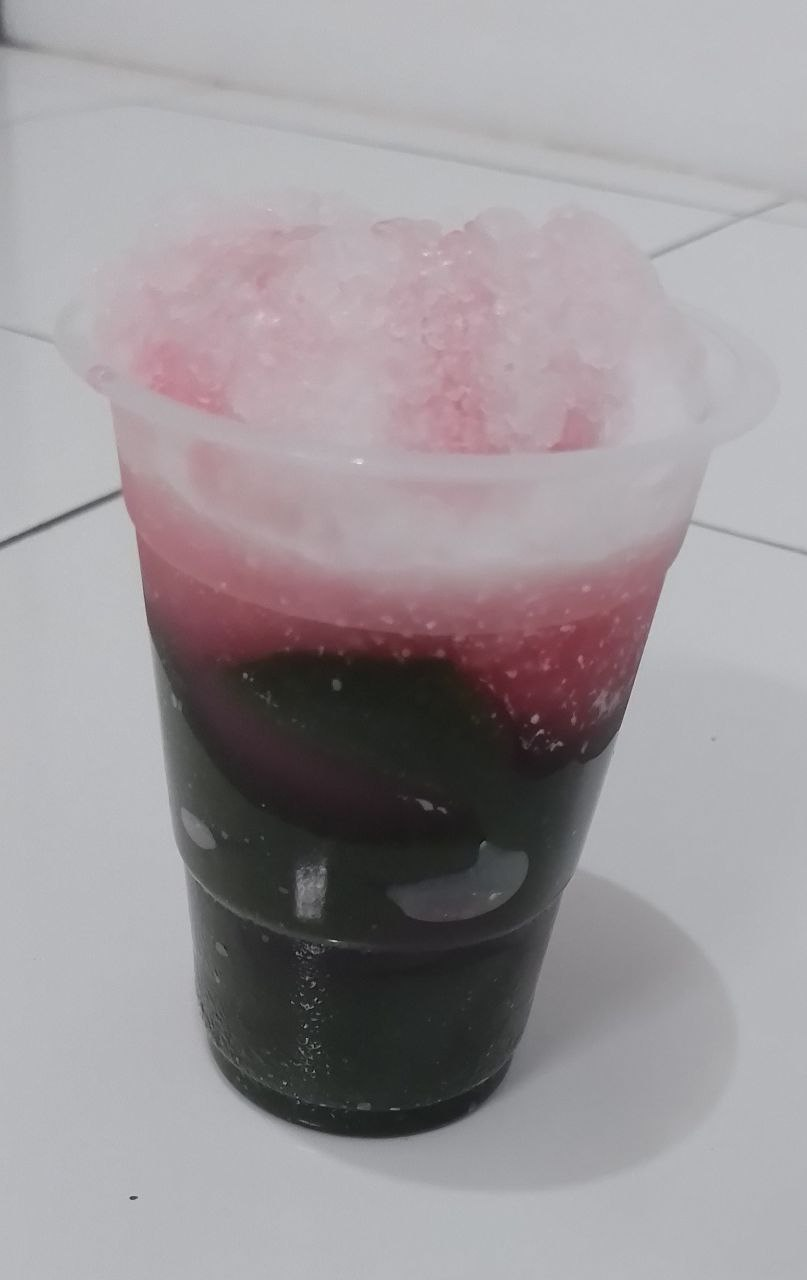
Es Cincau, Indonesian beverage made from Platostoma palustre plant

Mesona is primarily used in making grass jelly. The leaves and stems of the plant are dried and oxidized, much like tea, then processed into a jelly. The plant extracts of the black variant of grass jelly (Mesona palustris) have been reported to induce anti-diabetic, anti-cancer, and anti-diarrhea effects in pre-clinical research, all of which are possible due to the strong antioxidant nature of the extracts.

P. palustre is cultivated on flat ground or areas with a slight slope. In Taiwan, this plant is often grown under fruit trees in fruit orchards as a secondary crop. The plant is processed by harvesting all the aerial portions above the root. The portions are then partially dried and piled up in order to allow them to oxidize until they have darkened. After the oxidation, they are then thoroughly dried for sale.
