= Lewis Leonard Forman =

British botanist

Lewis Leonard Forman (29 June 1929 – 16 June 1998) was a British botanist, born in London. He was an expert on spermatophytes, particularly Menispermaceae, and specialised in the plants of Southeast Asia. He graduated from the University of London in 1950 and was appointed to the staff of the Royal Botanic Gardens, Kew in 1951, serving as a senior official there from 1966 to 1989.

The standard author abbreviation Forman is used to indicate this person as the author when citing a botanical name.

== Legacy ==
Forman has been honoured in these eponymous names:

- Glochidion formanii Airy Shaw
- Litsea formanii Kosterm.
- Medinilla formanii Regalado
- Stephania formanii Kundu & S.Guha
- Tinospora formanii Udayan & Pradeep
