= List of grass jelly plants =

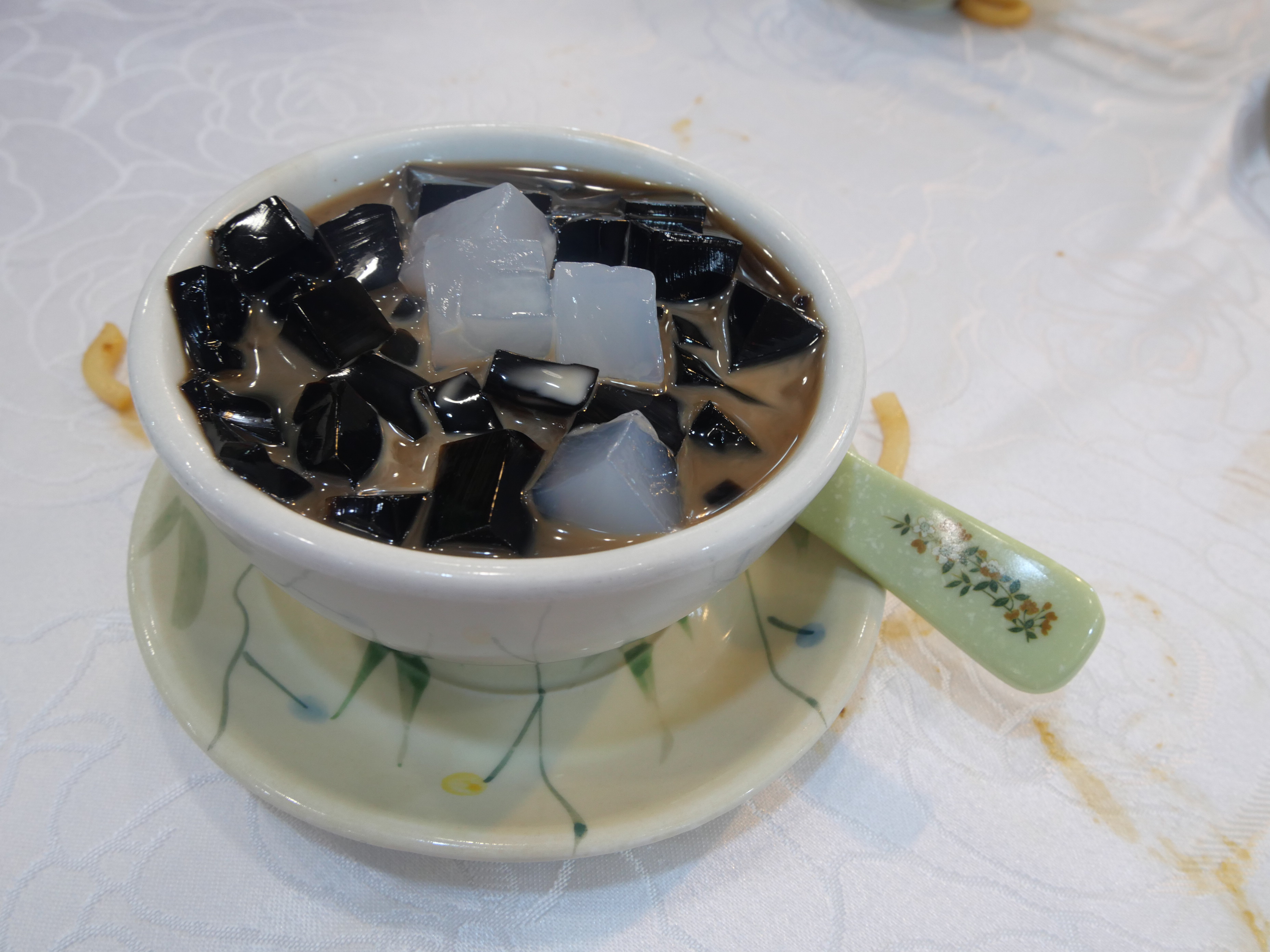
A bowl of grass jelly from a Chinese restaurant in Yuen Long

Grass jelly is a gelatinous dessert that is usually made from a plant in the mint family called Platostoma palustre. It and similar desserts can be made from other grass jelly plants. Some are also used for making beverages.

There are two main types, green grass jelly and black grass jelly. Green grass jelly plants include Premna trichostoma and Cyclea barbata, while black (also called janggelan) includes species like P. palustre

In Indonesian, grass jelly plants are called tanaman cincau. In Javanese, these plants are called camcao, juju, or kepleng and in Sundanese they are called camcauh or tahulu.

There are other plants that could possibly be used for making grass jelly but are not currently known to be used as such.

== Grass jelly plants ==
Accepted species name	Synonyms	English common name(s)	Chinese common name(s)	Indonesian common name(s)	Japanese common name(s)	Thai common name(s)	Vietnamese common name(s)	Family	Image
Platostoma palustre	P. palustre synonyms (Note: P. palustre synonyms include: Mesona palustris; Geniosporum parviflorum; Mesona chinensis; Mesona elegans; Mesona parviflora; Mesona philippinensis; Mesona procumbens; Mesona wallichiana; Platostoma chinense)	black grass jelly; Chinese mesona	P. palustre Chinese names (Note: P. palustre Chinese names include: hsian tsao/xiān cǎo/sian-chháu (仙草); xiānrén cǎo (仙人草); xiān cǎo jiù (仙草舅))	cincau hitam		T̂n c̄heāḱwy (ต้นเฉาก๊วย)	sương sáo; thạch đen	Lamiaceae	
Melastoma malabathricum subsp. malabathricum	M. M. subsp. malabathricum synonyms (Note: M. M. subsp. malabathricum synonyms include: Melastoma adpressum; Melastoma affine; Melastoma anoplanthum; Melastoma articulatum; Melastoma banksii; Melastoma baumeanum; Melastoma brachyodon; Melastoma caesium; Melastoma calycinum; Melastoma candidum; Melastoma candidum f. albiflorum; Melastoma candidum var. alessandrense; Melastoma candidum var. nobotan; Melastoma decemdentatum; Melastoma ellipticum; Melastoma heterostegium; Melastoma holmanii; Melastoma hombronianum; Melastoma homostegium; Melastoma imbricatum var. longipes; Melastoma jackianum; Melastoma lanaense; Melastoma macrocarpum; Melastoma macrocarpum; Melastoma malabathricum var. adpressum; Melastoma malabathricum var. grandiflorum; Melastoma malabathricum var. nanum; Melastoma malabathricum var. perakense; Melastoma membranaceum; Melastoma nabotan; Melastoma nobotan; Melastoma novae-hollandiae; Melastoma obvolutum; Melastoma oliganthum; Melastoma parvifolium; Melastoma pinatubense; Melastoma pusillum; Melastoma royenii; Melastoma scabrum; Melastoma sechellarum; Melastoma septemnervium; Melastoma setigerum; Melastoma stenophyllum; Melastoma suave; Melastoma tidorense; Melastoma tondanense; Melastoma warrineri; Osbeckia royenii; Trembleya rhynanthera)			cincau pohon				Melastomataceae	
Nephroia orbiculata	N. orbiculata synonyms (Note: N. orbiculata synonyms include: Cebatha orbiculata; Cissampelos orbiculata; Cissampelos pareira var. orbiculata; Cocculus orbiculatus; Menispermum orbiculatum; Cebatha cuneifolia; Cebatha ferrandiana; Cebatha integra; Cebatha lonchophylla; Cebatha mollis; Cebatha orbiculata f. macrophylla; Cebatha virgata; Cocculus cuneatus; Cocculus cynanchoides; Cocculus diantherus; Cocculus dichopetalus; Cocculus elegans; Cocculus ferrandianus; Cocculus hexagynus; Cocculus integer; Cocculus lenissimus; Cocculus lonchophyllus; Cocculus mokiangensis; Cocculus mollis; Cocculus nephroia; Cocculus orbiculatus; Cocculus orbiculatus f. macrophyllus; Cocculus orbiculatus var. mollis; Cocculus ovalifolius; Cocculus ovalifolius; Cocculus perraudi; Cocculus sarmentosus; Cocculus sarmentosus var. linearis; Cocculus sarmentosus var. pauciflorus; Cocculus sarmentosus var. stenophyllus; Cocculus thunbergii; Cocculus triflorus; Cocculus trilobus; Cocculus umbellatus; Cocculus virgatus; Ferrandia oleifera; Holopeira fecunda; Holopeira lonchophylla; Limacia kunstleri; Menispermum hexagynum; Menispermum ovalifolium; Menispermum reniforme; Menispermum triflorum; Menispermum trilobum; Nephroia cuneifolia; Nephroia cynanchoides; Nephroia dianthera; Nephroia dilatata; Nephroia elegans; Nephroia ferrandiana; Nephroia hastata; Nephroia hexagyna; Nephroia mollis; Nephroia ovalifolius; Nephroia pubinervis; Nephroia sarmentosa; Nephroia thunbergii; Nephroia triloba; Bradleia nephroia)	Chinese green grass jelly		cincau cina				Menispermaceae	
Cyclea barbata	Cyclea ciliata; Cyclea wallichii	green grass jelly		cincau rambat; cincau bulu; cincau hijau rambat				Menispermaceae	
Premna microphylla	P. microphylla synonyms (Note: P. microphylla synonyms include: Gumira japonica; Gumira microphylla; Premna formosana; Premna japonica; Premna luxurians; Premna microphylla var. glabra; Premna microphylla var. luxurians)		P. microphylla Chinese names (Note: P. microphylla Chinese names include: 豆腐柴 (dòufu chái); 斑鸠树 (bānjiū shù); 臭黄荆 (chòu huáng jīng); 腐蜱 (fǔ pí); 观音草 (guānyīn cǎo); 臭黃荊 (chòu huáng jīng))		ハマクサギ (hamakusagi)		cách lá nhỏ	Lamiaceae	
Premna parasitica	Gumira parasitica; Premna parasitica var. hatusimae	grass jelly shrub						Lamiaceae	
Premna puberula								Lamiaceae	
Premna serratifolia	P. serratifolia synonyms (Note: P. serratifolia synonyms include: Premna obtusifolia f. serratifolia; Premna obtusifolia var. serratifolia; Cornutia corymbosa; Gumira abbreviata; Gumira attenuata; Gumira ceramensis; Gumira cyclophylla; Gumira dallachyana; Gumira divaricata; Gumira domestica; Gumira foetida; Gumira integrifolia; Gumira laevigata; Gumira limbata; Gumira nauseosa; Gumira nitida; Gumira opulifolia; Gumira punctulata; Gumira truncata; Premna abbreviata; Premna acuminatissima; Premna angustior; Premna arborea; Premna atra; Premna attenuata; Premna benguetensis; Premna benthamiana; Premna borneensis; Premna brongersmae; Premna capitata; Premna ceramensis; Premna congesta; Premna corymbosa; Premna corymbosa var. madagascariensis; Premna corymbosa var. minor; Premna corymbosa var. obtusifolia; Premna corymbosa var. sambucina; Premna cyclophylla; Premna dallachyana; Premna dallachyana var. obtusisepala; Premna dallachyana var. typica; Premna dentatifolia; Premna divaricata; Premna foetida; Premna gaudichaudii; Premna glabra; Premna glandulifera; Premna glandulosa; Premna glycycocca; Premna guillauminii var. serrata; Premna hircina; Premna integrifolia; Premna integrifolia; Premna integrifolia var. angustior; Premna integrifolia; Premna integrifolia var. minor; Premna integrifolia var. obtusifolia; Premna integrifolia; Premna kunstleri; Premna laevigata; Premna lamii; Premna leucostoma; Premna leytensis; Premna limbata; Premna lucidula; Premna macrophylla; Premna media; Premna membranifolia; Premna nauseosa; Premna nitida; Premna obtusifolia; Premna obtusifolia var. angustior; Premna obtusifolia var. gaudichaudii; Premna obtusifolia var. madagascariensis; Premna obtusifolia var. minor; Premna obtusifolia var. pubescens; Premna obtusifolia var. velutina; Premna octonervia; Premna opulifolia; Premna ovata; Premna paniculata; Premna papuana; Premna parviflora; Premna perrottetii; Premna populifolia; Premna punctulata; Premna sambucina; Premna serratifolia var. minor; Premna spinosa; Premna subcordata; Premna subglabra; Premna sumatrana; Premna syringifolia; Premna tahitensis var. rapensis; Premna tahitensis var. rimatarensis; Premna tateana; Premna tiliifolia; Premna timoriana; Premna truncata; Premna woodii; Premna wrayi; Scrophularioides arborea; Citharexylum paniculatum)			cincau perdu				Lamiaceae	
Premna trichostoma	P. trichostoma synonyms (Note: P. trichostoma synonyms include: Gumira trichostoma; Premna areolata; Premna cowanii; Premna ledermannii; Premna moluccana; Premna oblongata f. longituba; Premna oblongata var. subglabra; Premna oblongifolia; Premna oblongifolia var. angustata; Premna oblongifolia var. clemensorum; Premna oblongifolia var. major; Premna oblongifolia var. subglabra; Premna perakensis; Premna quadridentata; Premna ridleyi; Premna williamsii; Wendlandia papuana)	shrub grass jelly		cincau perdu				Lamiaceae	
Stephania capitata	S. capitata synonyms (Note: S. capitata synonyms include: Clypea capitata; Clypea acuminatissima; Stephania acuminata; Stephania acuminatissima; Stephania longifolia; Stephania obvia; Stephania truncata)	jug grass grass jelly		cincau minyak; cincau hijau pohon				Menispermaceae	
Stephania japonica	Cocculus japonicus; Menispermum japonicum			cincau minyak				Menispermaceae	
Stephania japonica var. discolor	S. j. var. discolor synonyms (Note: S. j. var. discolor synonyms include: Clypea discolor; Stephania discolor; Stephania hernandiifolia var. discolor; Cissampelos hernandiifolia; Cissampelos hexandra; Clypea hernandiifolia; Clypea oxyphylla; Cocculus finlaysonianus; Stephania australis; Stephania australis; Stephania discolor var. hernandiifolia; Stephania gaudichaudii; Stephania hallieri; Stephania hernandiifolia; Stephania latifolia)			cincau minyak				Menispermaceae	
Tiliacora triandra	T. triandra synonyms (Note: T. triandra synonyms include: Cocculus triandrus; Limacia triandra; Menispermum triandrum; Aristega laevifolia; Limacia amherstiana; Limacia wallichiana; Sebicea stipularis; Tiliacora laevifolia; Tiliacora stipularis)	bamboo grass; yanang leaves				yanang	sương sâm	Menispermaceae	

== See also ==
- Aiyu jelly
- Bingfen
- Climbing fig tofu
- O-aew
