= Masahiko Kimura (disambiguation) =

Masahiko Kimura is a Japanese judo practitioner.

Masahiko Kimura is the name of:

- Masahiko Kimura (bonsai artist) (born 1940), Japanese bonsai artist
- Masahiko Kimura (footballer) (born 1984), Japanese association football player
