= Fu pi =

Fu pi, Fu Pi, or fǔ pí can refer to:

- fǔ pí (腐蜱), a Chinese name for the plant Premna microphylla
- Fu Pi (苻丕) (fl. 357-386), a Chinese emperor
- FUPI (Federación Universitaria Pro Independencia, known in English as Puerto Rico Pro-Independence University Federation, a student organization
