= Premna thwaitesii =

Scientific classification
- Kingdom: Plantae
- Clade: Tracheophytes
- Clade: Angiosperms
- Clade: Eudicots
- Clade: Asterids
- Order: Lamiales
- Family: Lamiaceae
- Genus: Premna
- Species: P. thwaitesii

Binomial name
- Premna thwaitesii C.B.Clarke

Synonyms
- Gumira thwaitesii (C.B.Clarke) Kuntze; Premna micrantha Thwaites [Illegitimate]; Premna thwaitesii f. glabrescens Moldenke

Species of plant

Premna thwaitesii, is an 8m high small tree in the family Lamiaceae. It is endemic to Sri Lanka.
