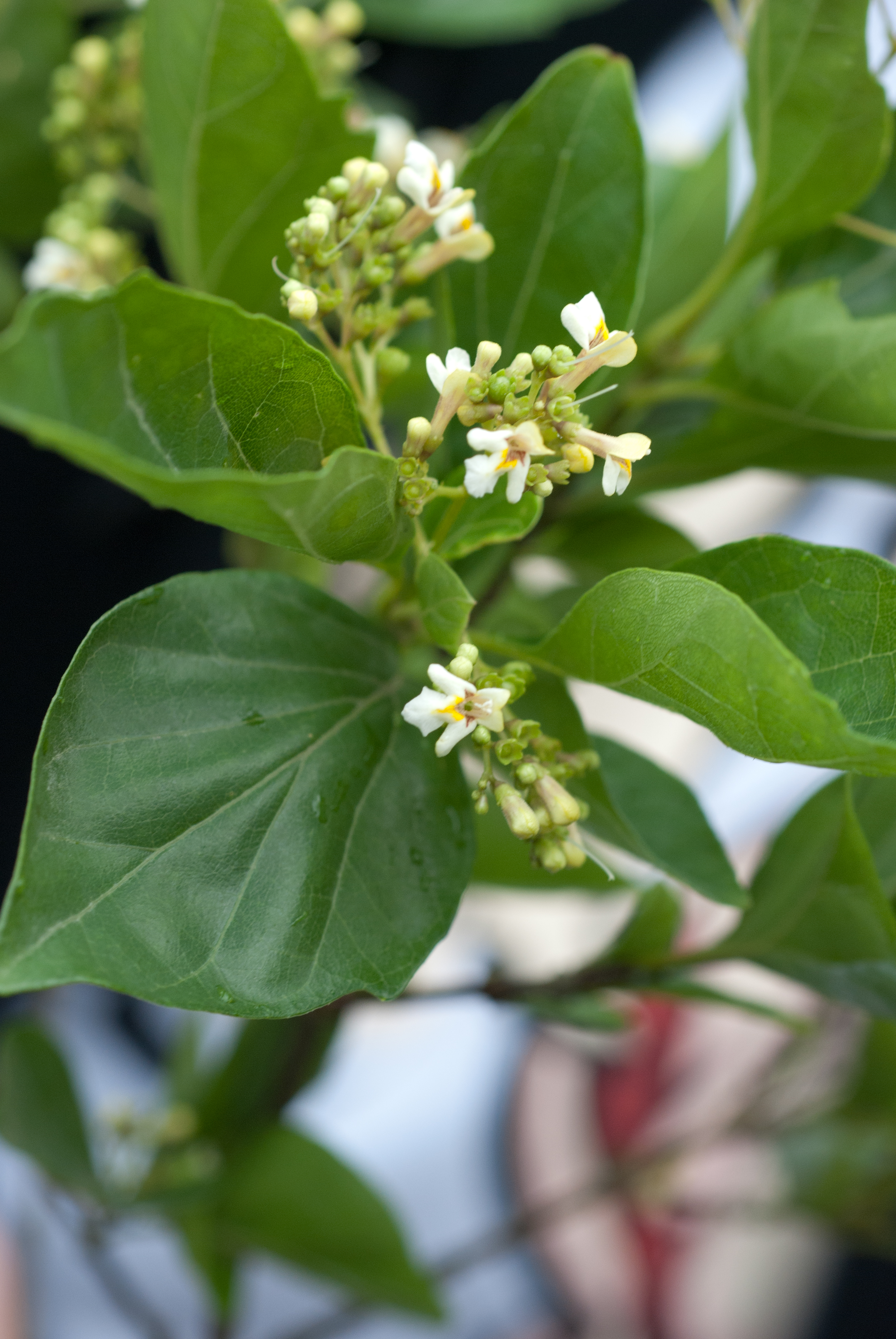

Conservation status
- Least Concern (IUCN 3.1)

Scientific classification
- Kingdom: Plantae
- Clade: Embryophytes
- Clade: Tracheophytes
- Clade: Spermatophytes
- Clade: Angiosperms
- Clade: Eudicots
- Clade: Asterids
- Order: Lamiales
- Family: Lamiaceae
- Genus: Premna
- Species: P. microphylla

Binomial name
- Premna microphylla Turcz. 1863

Synonyms
- Gumira japonica (Miq.) Kuntze; Gumira microphylla (Turcz.) Kuntze (homotypic synonym); Premna formosana Maxim.; Premna japonica Miq.; Premna luxurians Nakai; Premna microphylla var. glabra Nakai; Premna microphylla var. luxurians (Nakai) Moldenke

= Premna microphylla =

Species of small tree

Premna microphylla is a tree in the mint family (Lamiaceae).

== Names ==
P. microphylla has the English common names Japanese premna, (Japanese) musk maple, and Japanese neem tree. It is also called tofu tree because of the tofu-like food made from the leaves.

The specific epithet microphylla derives from Greek μικροϛ (micros) and φυλλον (phyllon) and means 'small leaves'. The name for the genus Premna derives from the Greek πρέμνον (premnon, tree stump) refers to the short trunks that some species have.

In Japanese it is called ハマクサギ (hamakusagi). In China, it is known as 豆腐柴 (dòufu chái 'tofu wood'), 斑鸠树 (bānjiū shù 'turtledove tree'), 臭黄荆 (chòu huáng jīng 'stinky yellow thorn'), 腐蜱 (fǔ pí 'rotten tick'), and 观音草 (guānyīn cǎo 'Guanyin grass'). In Taiwan it is called 臭黃荊 (chòu huáng jīng) The plant is called cách lá nhỏ in Vietnamese.

== Description ==
P. microphylla is a tree and has square, woody, mostly smooth stems and branches. The plant reaches 2–6 m (6 ft 7 in – 19 ft 8 in) in height, and around 3 m (9.8 ft) wide. It grows as a nanophanerophyte or phanerophyte.

The leaves are sessile, ovate-lanceolate in shape and tapered near the tip. The leaves grow in an opposite pattern. The leaf margins are serrate from the middle to the apex. Both sides of the leaves are scabrous and covered with very short 'hairs'. The leaves have a strong odor that has been compared to those of Serissa.

The flowers are hermaphroditic and grow in conical panicles. The 5-part calyx is short, cup-shaped, and purplish-green. The calyx surrounds a funnel-shaped corolla that is pale yellow. The petals are 0.3–0.4 inches (7.6–10.2 mm) long. The cream-colored and zygomorphic flowers bloom in May and August.

The drupe is obovate to nearly spherical and purple-black when ripe.

Major compounds found in the essential oil include blumenol c, β-cedrene, limonene, α-guaiene, cryptone, and α-cyperone.

== Distribution ==
The plant is found in southern China, central and southern Japan, and Taiwan. The type specimen was collected by Scottish botanist and plant hunter Robert Fortune in China. It prefers growing in slightly acidic to acidic soil mainly on woodland edges or understory at an altitude of 500–1,000 metres (1,600–3,300 ft) in elevation.

== Ecology ==
The growing season is yearly from March to November. The pollination syndrome for P. microphylla is melittophily, with bee and wasp pollinators including Xylocopa amamensis, Cerceris yuwanensis, and Hylaeus insularum. There are no major diseases or insect pests known. There is some evidence that sika deer will nibble on the tree occasionally.

== Uses ==
P. microphylla is used for food. The leaves can be used to make a pectin-rich gel that is something like tofu. The jelly is similar to grass jelly but it not usually called that, unlike other grass jelly plants. This green gel is called 神仙豆腐 (shénxiān dòufu, immortal/divine tofu) or 觀音豆腐 (Guānyīn dòufu, Guanyin tofu). In English it is sometimes called green leaf tofu. A similar 'fairy tofu' is made from the leaves of Premna puberula. The leaves are high in protein (13.48%), and while not as much as soybeans, it is high for a leaf vegetable and ranks closer to cereal grains like hard wheat (12.6%) rather than spinach (2.9%). To make the 'tofu', the leaves are washed and crushed with some water to facilitate grinding. Culinary ash is added to the strained mixture and it is allowed to set. Some cooks burn specific wood for the ash, such as Osmanthus. The dish is considered a refreshing summer treat. Production is small and local, and not done on an industrial scale.

Much effort has been made to develop P. microphylla as an industrial source of pectin. The leaves contain 30-40% pectin, much higher than the typical sources, apple pomace (10-15%) and citrus peel (20-30%).

The plant is also used for bonsai because of its small, strong-smelling leaves. The bonsai trunks are evocative of driftwood, similar to shimpaku juniper. A specimen of P. microphylla was used as an autonomous bonsai in the art installation titled Premna Daemon.
