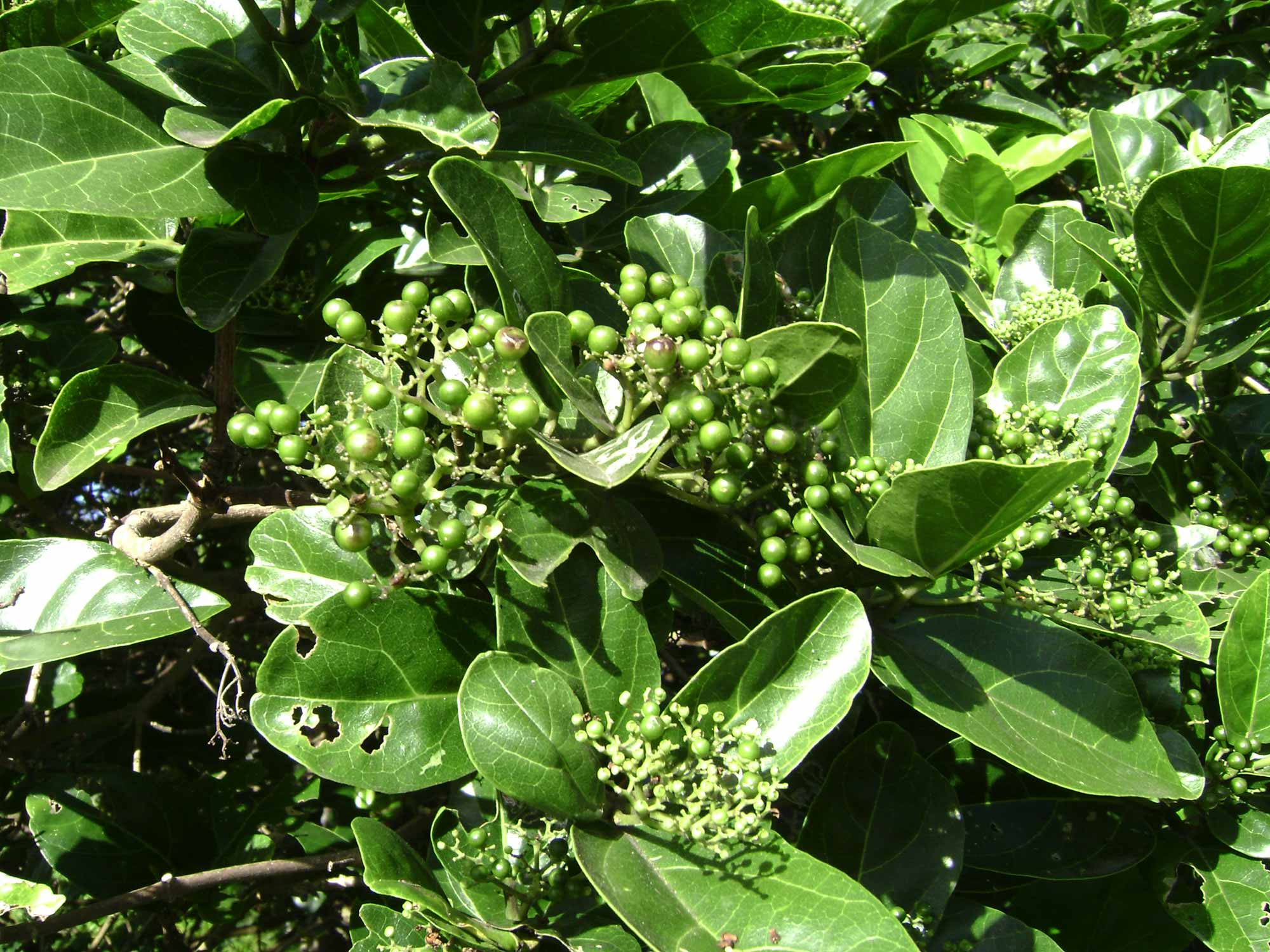
- Premna serratifolia

Scientific classification
- Kingdom: Plantae
- Clade: Tracheophytes
- Clade: Angiosperms
- Clade: Eudicots
- Clade: Asterids
- Order: Lamiales
- Family: Lamiaceae
- Subfamily: Viticoideae
- Genus: Premna; L.

Synonyms
- Scrophularioides G.Forst. without description; Scobia Noronha; Solia Noronha; Holochiloma Hochst.; Gumira Rumph. ex Hassk.; Tatea F.Muell.; Pygmaeopremna Merr.; Surfacea Moldenke

= Premna =

Genus of flowering plants

Premna is a genus of flowering plants in the mint family, Lamiaceae, first described for modern science in 1771. It is widespread through tropical and subtropical regions in Africa, southern Asia, northern Australia, and various islands in the Pacific and Indian Oceans.

Species

1. Premna acuminata R.Br. - Australia, New Guinea
2. Premna acutata W.W.Sm. - southwestern China (Yunnan, Sichuan)
3. Premna alba H.J.Lam - Palau
4. Premna ambongensis Moldenke - Madagascar
5. Premna amplectens Wall. ex Schauer - Thailand, Myanmar
6. Premna angolensis Gürke - tropical Africa
7. Premna angustiflora H.J.Lam - Palau
8. Premna annulata H.R.Fletcher - Thailand, Laos, Vietnam
9. Premna aureolepidota Moldenke - Madagascar
10. Premna balakrishnanii A.Rajendran & P.Daniel - Tamil Nadu
11. Premna balansae Dop - Vietnam
12. Premna barbata Wall. ex Schauer - Indian Subcontinent, Myanmar
13. Premna bengalensis C.B.Clarke - Indian Subcontinent, Myanmar, Vietnam
14. Premna bequaertii Moldenke - Uganda, Rwanda, Zaïre
15. Premna bracteata Wall. ex C.B.Clarke - Himalayas, Tibet, Yunnan, Nepal, Assam, Bhutan, Myanmar
16. Premna cambodiana Dop - Cambodia, Vietnam
17. Premna cavaleriei H.Lév - China (Guangdong, Guangxi, Guizhou, Hunan, Jiangxi)
18. Premna chevalieri Dop - Thailand, Laos, Vietnam, China (Hainan, Yunnan)
19. Premna chrysoclada (Bojer) Gürke - Kenya, Tanzania, Guinea-Bissau
20. Premna collinsae Craib - Thailand
21. Premna confinis C.Pei & S.L.Chen ex C.Y.Wu - China (Guangxi, Yunnan)
22. Premna congolensis Moldenke - Zaïre, Angola, Cabinda
23. Premna cordifolia Roxb. - Thailand, Vietnam, Malaya
24. Premna coriacea C.B.Clarke - Indian Subcontinent, Thailand, Andaman Islands
25. Premna corymbosa Rottler - India, Sri Lanka, Andaman & Nicobar Islands
26. Premna crassa Hand.-Mazz. - Vietnam, China (Guangxi, Guizhou, Yunnan)
27. Premna debiana A.Rajendran & P.Daniel - Arunachal Pradesh
28. Premna decaryi Moldenke - Madagascar
29. Premna decurrens H.J.Lam - Indonesia
30. Premna discolor Verdc. - Kenya
31. Premna dubia Craib - Laos, Thailand, Vietnam
32. Premna esculenta Roxb. - Assam, Bangladesh, Myanmar, Thailand
33. Premna fohaiensis C.Pei & S.L.Chen ex C.Y.Wu - China (Yunnan)
34. Premna fordii Dunn - China (Guangdong, Guangxi, Hainan)
35. Premna fulva Craib - Indochina, Indonesia, China (Guangxi, Guizhou, Yunnan)
36. Premna garrettii H.R.Fletcher - Thailand
37. Premna glaberrima Wight - southern India
38. Premna glandulosa Hand.-Mazz. - China (Yunnan)
39. Premna gracillima Verdc. - Kenya, Tanzania
40. Premna grandifolia A.D.J. Meeuse, illegitimate name, = Premna hutchinsonii
41. Premna grossa Wall. ex Schauer - Myanmar
42. Premna guillauminii Moldenke - New Caledonia
43. Premna hainanensis Chun & F.C.How - China (Hainan)
44. Premna hans-joachimii Verdc. - Tanzania
45. Premna henryana (Hand.-Mazz.) C.Y.Wu - China (Sichuan, Yunnan)
46. Premna herbacea Roxb. - Himalayas, Yunnan, Indian Subcontinent, Southeast Asia, Indonesia, New Guinea, northern Australia
47. Premna hildebrandtii Gürke - Zaire, Kenya, Tanzania, Mozambique, Zimbabwe
48. Premna hispida Benth. - West Africa
49. Premna humbertii Moldenke - Madagascar
50. Premna hutchinsonii Moldenke - Ivory Coast
51. Premna interrupta Wall. ex Schauer - southern China, Himalayas, Indochina
52. Premna jalpaiguriana T.K.Paul - West Bengal
53. Premna khasiana C.B.Clarke - Assam, Thailand
54. Premna lepidella Moldenke - Madagascar
55. Premna ligustroides Hemsl - China (Guizhou, Hubei, Jiangxi, Sichuan)
56. Premna longiacuminata Moldenke - Madagascar
57. Premna longifolia Roxb. - Himalayas
58. Premna longipetiolata Moldenke - Madagascar
59. Premna lucens A.Chev. - West Africa
60. Premna macrophylla Wall. ex Schauer - Assam, Indochina
61. Premna madagascariensis Moldenke - Madagascar
62. Premna mariannarum Schauer - Mariana Islands
63. Premna matadiensis Moldenke - Zaïre, Angola
64. Premna maxima T.C.E. Fr. - Kenya
65. Premna mekongensis W.W.Sm. - China (Yunnan)
66. Premna micrantha Schauer - India, Assam, Bangladesh
67. Premna microphylla Turcz. - Japan, Ryukyu Islands, China (Anhui, Fujian, Guangdong, Guangxi, Guizhou, Hainan, Henan, Hubei, Hunan, Jiangxi, Sichuan, Taiwan, Yunnan, Zhejiang)
68. Premna milleflora C.B.Clarke - Assam
69. Premna milnei Baker - Nigeria, Bioko
70. Premna minor Domin - Queensland
71. Premna mollissima Roth - Indian Subcontinent, Yunnan, Indochina, Philippines
72. Premna mooiensis (H.Pearson) W.Piep - Mozambique, Eswatini, South Africa
73. Premna mortehanii De Wild - Zaïre
74. Premna mundanthuraiensis A.Rajendran & P.Daniel - Tamil Nadu
75. Premna neurophylla Chiov. - Ethiopia
76. Premna oblongata Miq. - Indonesia, Philippines
77. Premna odorata Blanco - - Indian Subcontinent, Yunnan, Southeast Asia, New Guinea, northern Australia; naturalized in Miami-Dade County in Florida
78. Premna oligantha C.Y.Wu - China (Sichuan, Tibet, Yunnan)
79. Premna oligotricha Baker - Ethiopia, Somalia, Kenya, Tanzania
80. Premna orangeana Capuron - Madagascar
81. Premna paisehensis C.Pei & S.L.Chen - China (Guangxi)
82. Premna pallescens Ridl.- Borneo, Indonesia
83. Premna parasitica Blume - Indonesia
84. Premna parvilimba C.Pei - China (Yunnan)
85. Premna paucinervis (C.B.Clarke) Gamble - Kerala, Tamil Nadu
86. Premna paulobarbata H.J.Lam - Mariana Islands
87. Premna perplexans Moldenke - Madagascar
88. Premna perrieri Moldenke - Madagascar
89. Premna pinguis C.B.Clarke - Assam, Bangladesh, Myanmar, Java
90. Premna polita Hiern - Angola
91. Premna procumbens Moon - India, Bangladesh, Sri Lanka
92. Premna protrusa A.C.Sm. & S.Darwin - Fiji
93. Premna puberula Pamp. - China (Fujian, Gansu, Guangdong, Guangxi, Guizhou, Hubei, Hunan, Shanxi, Sichuan, Yunnan)
94. Premna pubescens Blume - Indonesia, Philippines, Christmas Island
95. Premna puerensis Y.Y.Qian - China (Yunnan)
96. Premna punduana Wall. ex Schauer - Arunachal Pradesh, Assam, Bangladesh
97. Premna punicea C.Y.Wu - China (Yunnan)
98. Premna purpurascens Thwaites - Sri Lanka
99. Premna quadrifolia Schumach. & Thonn. - West Africa
100. Premna rabakensis Moldenke - Cambodia
101. Premna regularis H.J.Lam - Philippines, Indonesia, New Guinea
102. Premna repens H.R.Fletcher - Thailand
103. Premna resinosa (Hochst.) Schauer - East Africa, Arabian Peninsula, India
104. Premna richardsiae Moldenke - Tanzania
105. Premna rubroglandulosa C.Y.Wu - China (Yunnan)
106. Premna scandens Roxb. - China (Yunnan), Himalayas, Andaman Island, Indochina
107. Premna schimperi Engl - East Africa
108. Premna schliebenii Werderm. - Tanzania, Mozambique
109. Premna scoriarum W.W.Sm. - Tibet, Yunnan, Myanmar
110. Premna senensis Klotzsch - eastern + central Africa
111. Premna serrata H.R.Fletcher - Thailand
112. Premna serratifolia L. - widespread in East Africa, the Indian Subcontinent, Southeast Asia, northern Australia, islands of Pacific + Indian Oceans
113. Premna siamensis H.R.Fletcher - Thailand
114. Premna stenobotrys Merr. - Vietnam
115. Premna steppicola Hand.-Mazz. - China (Sichuan, Yunnan)
116. †Premna sterculiifolia King & Gamble - Malaya but extinct
117. Premna straminicaulis C.Y.Wu - China (Yunnan)
118. Premna subcapitata Rehder - China (Sichuan, Yunnan)
119. Premna sulphurea (Baker) Gürke - Angola
120. Premna sunyiensis C.Pei - China (Guangdong)
121. Premna szemaoensis Pei - China (Yunnan)
122. Premna tahitensis J.Schauer - many islands of the Pacific
123. Premna tanganyikensis Moldenke - Tanzania, Mozambique
124. Premna tapintzeana Dop - China (Yunnan)
125. Premna tenii C.Pei - China (Yunnan)
126. Premna thorelii Dop - Laos
127. Premna thwaitesii C.B.Clarke - Sri Lanka
128. Premna tomentosa Willd. - Indian Subcontinent, Southeast Asia, Queensland, Solomon Islands
129. Premna trichostoma Miq. - Southeast Asia, Indonesia, New Guinea
130. Premna urticifolia Rehder - China (Yunnan)
131. Premna velutina Gürke - Burundi, Kenya, Tanzania, Mozambique
132. Premna venulosa Moldenke - Madagascar
133. Premna wightiana Schauer - India, Sri Lanka
134. Premna wui Boufford & B.M.Barthol. - China (Yunnan)
135. Premna yunnanensis W.W.Sm - China (Sichuan, Yunnan)
