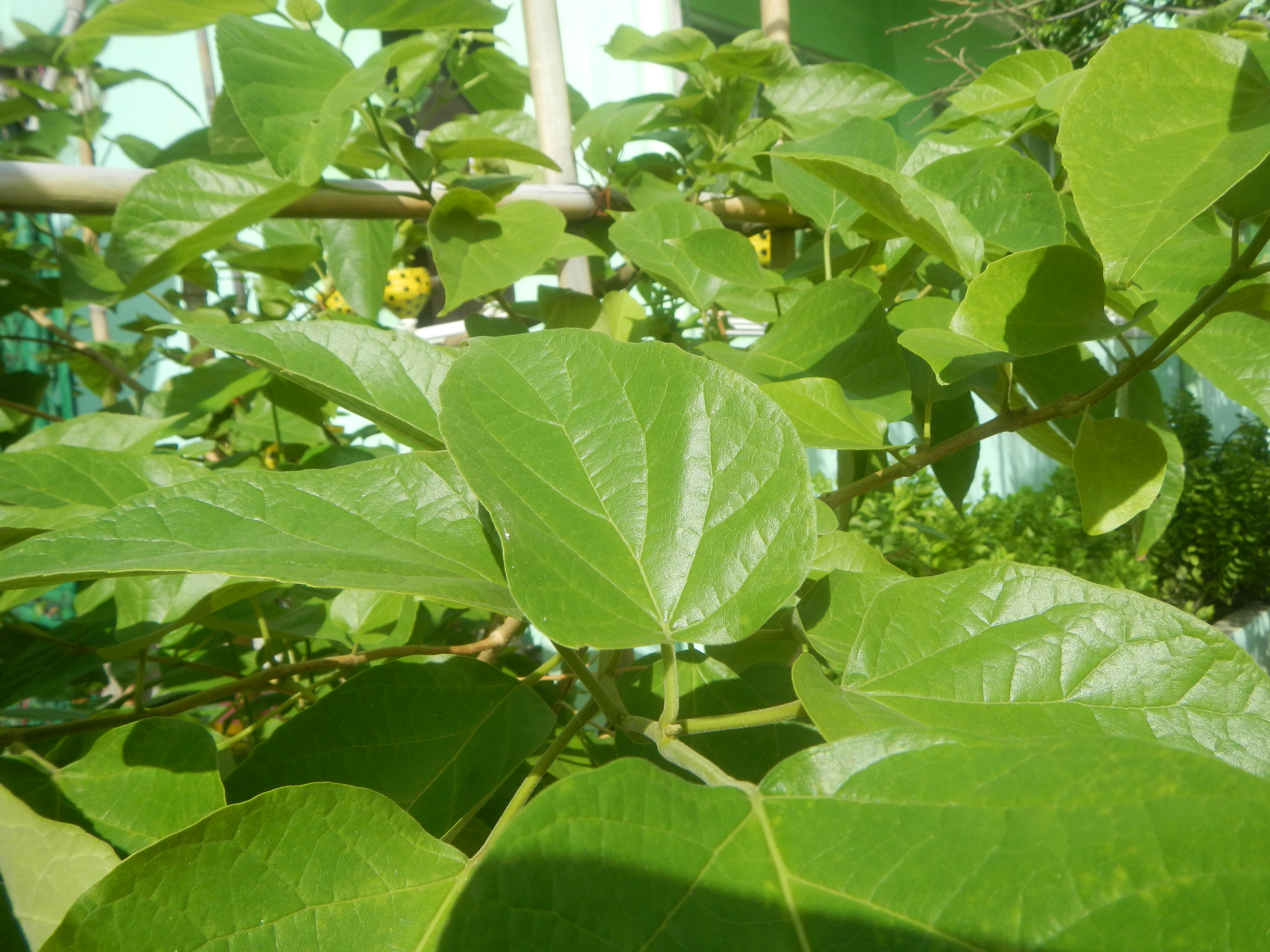

Scientific classification
- Kingdom: Plantae
- Clade: Tracheophytes
- Clade: Angiosperms
- Clade: Eudicots
- Clade: Asterids
- Order: Lamiales
- Family: Lamiaceae
- Genus: Premna
- Species: P. odorata

Binomial name
- Premna odorata Blanco

Synonyms
- List: *Gumira flavescens Kuntze; *Gumira leucostoma (Miq.) Kuntze; *Gumira odorata (Blanco) Kuntze; *Gumira vestita (Schauer) Kuntze; *Premna cumingiana var. pierreana (Dop) P.H.Hô; *Premna curranii H.J.Lam; *Premna depauperata Merr.; *Premna goeringii Turcz.; *Premna hamiltonii J.L.Ellis; *Premna inaequilateralis Beer & H.J.Lam; *Premna latifolia var. major Moldenke; *Premna leucostoma Miq.; *Premna maclurei Merr.; *Premna odorata var. detergibilis (C.B.Clarke) Moldenke; *Premna odorata var. pierreana (Dop) Moldenke; *Premna peekelii H.J.Lam; *Premna rubens (C.B.Clarke) Ridl.; *Premna rufidula Miq.; *Premna ruttenii H.J.Lam; *Premna subscandens Merr.; *Premna vestita Schauer

= Premna odorata =

Species of plant

Premna odorata, the fragrant premna, is a species of flowering plant in the Lamiaceae family. It is native to the Indian subcontinent, Yunnan, Southeast Asia, New Guinea, and northern Australia, and naturalized in southern Florida.

A small tree rarely reaching 10 m, it is used as a source for traditional medicine in the Philippines, and is planted occasionally as an ornamental there and elsewhere.

The island of Siargao in the Philippines is named after P. odorata (known as siargaw or saliargaw in the local languages).

== See also ==
- Blumea balsamifera
- Chinese herbology
- Ethnobotany
- Ethnomedicine
- Herbal
- List of plants used in herbalism
- Traditional medicine
