= Premna hans-joachimii =

Conservation status
- Vulnerable (IUCN 3.1)

Scientific classification
- Kingdom: Plantae
- Clade: Tracheophytes
- Clade: Angiosperms
- Clade: Eudicots
- Clade: Asterids
- Order: Lamiales
- Family: Lamiaceae
- Genus: Premna
- Species: P. hans-joachimii

Binomial name
- Premna hans-joachimii Verdc.

Species of flowering plant

Premna hans-joachimii is a species of plant in the family Lamiaceae. It is native to southeastern Tanzania and northeastern Mozambique.
