= Premna maxima =

Conservation status
- Endangered (IUCN 3.1)

Scientific classification
- Kingdom: Plantae
- Clade: Tracheophytes
- Clade: Angiosperms
- Clade: Eudicots
- Clade: Asterids
- Order: Lamiales
- Family: Lamiaceae
- Genus: Premna
- Species: P. maxima

Binomial name
- Premna maxima T.C.E.Fr.

Species of flowering plant

Premna maxima is a species of plant in the family Lamiaceae. It is endemic to Kenya.
