= Premna schliebenii =

Conservation status
- Vulnerable (IUCN 2.3)

Scientific classification
- Kingdom: Plantae
- Clade: Tracheophytes
- Clade: Angiosperms
- Clade: Eudicots
- Clade: Asterids
- Order: Lamiales
- Family: Lamiaceae
- Genus: Premna
- Species: P. schliebenii

Binomial name
- Premna schliebenii Werderm.

Species of flowering plant

Premna schliebenii is a species of plant in the family Lamiaceae. It is found in Mozambique and Tanzania.
