= Premna puberula =

Conservation status
- Least Concern (IUCN 3.1)

Scientific classification
- Kingdom: Plantae
- Clade: Tracheophytes
- Clade: Angiosperms
- Clade: Eudicots
- Clade: Asterids
- Order: Lamiales
- Family: Lamiaceae
- Genus: Premna
- Species: P. puberula

Binomial name
- Premna puberula Pamp.

Varieties
- Premna puberula var. bodinieri (H.Lév.) C.Y.Wu & S.Y.Pao; Premna puberula var. puberula

Species of flowering plant

Premna puberula is a species of plant in the family Lamiaceae that is endemic to Central and South China. Known colloquially in South China as fairy tofu tree (神仙豆腐樹) or more simply as tofu tree (豆腐樹), the extract from the leaves of this plant, with its high pectin content, is used to make a jelly dish served in a similar manner as Chinese Liangfen. The leaves of Premna microphylla are used similarly, as are other grass jelly plants.
