= Premna barbata =

Scientific classification
- Kingdom: Plantae
- Clade: Tracheophytes
- Clade: Angiosperms
- Clade: Eudicots
- Clade: Asterids
- Order: Lamiales
- Family: Lamiaceae
- Genus: Premna
- Species: P. barbata

Binomial name
- Premna barbata Wall. ex Schauer

Synonyms
- Gumira barbata (Wall. ex Schauer) Kuntze; Premna calycinaHaines

Species of flowering plant

Premna barbata (Nepali: गिनेरी) is a plant species in the genus Premna (family Lamiaceae), first described in 1847. It is native to Myanmar and to the Indian subcontinent.
