= Premna mollissima =

Dusky fire brand mark

Scientific classification
- Kingdom: Plantae
- Clade: Tracheophytes
- Clade: Angiosperms
- Clade: Eudicots
- Clade: Asterids
- Order: Lamiales
- Family: Lamiaceae
- Genus: Premna
- Species: P. mollissima

Binomial name
- Premna mollissima Roth

Synonyms
- Gumira mollissima (Roth) Kuntze; Premna latifolia Roxb.; Premna latifolia var. cuneata C.B.Clarke; Premna latifolia var. gamblei Haines; Premna latifolia var. henryi D.Naras. ex A.Rajendran & P.Daniel; Premna latifolia var. major Moldenke; Premna latifolia var. mucronata (Roxb.) C.B.Clarke; Premna latifolia var. viburnoides C.B.Clarke; Premna mucronata Roxb.; Premna viburnoides Wall. ex Schauer; Premna viburnoides Wall.

Species of tree

Premna mollissima, the dusky fire brand mark, is an 8m high small tree in the family Lamiaceae. It is found in India, Bangladesh, and Sri Lanka.

== Description ==
The bark is grey to white in color. Leaves simple, opposite; ovate or elliptic ovate; base rounded; apex acuminate. Bisexual flowers are greenish white in color. Show corymbose cymes inflorescence. Fruit is a black drupe with oblong seeds.
