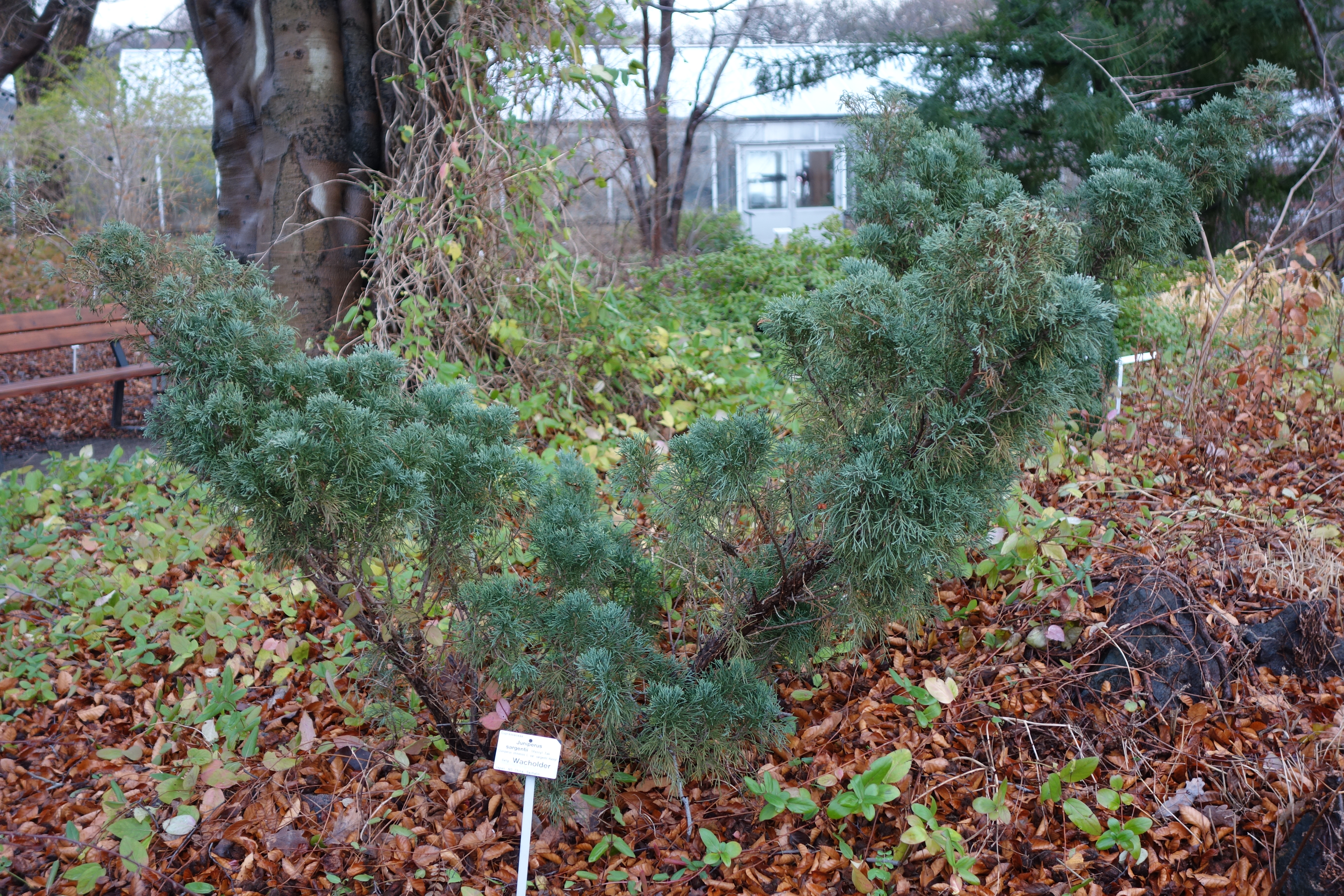
- Botanical specimen in the Botanischer Garten, Dresden, Germany

Conservation status
- Least Concern (IUCN 3.1)

Scientific classification
- Kingdom: Plantae
- Clade: Tracheophytes
- Clade: Gymnosperms
- Division: Pinophyta
- Class: Pinopsida
- Order: Cupressales
- Family: Cupressaceae
- Genus: Juniperus
- Species: J. chinensis
- Variety: J. c. var. sargentii

Trinomial name
- Juniperus chinensis var. sargentii A.Henry

Synonyms
- List: Juniperus chinensis subsp. sargentii (A.Henry) Silba; Juniperus procumbens Sarg.; Juniperus sargentii (A.Henry) Takeda ex Nakai; Sabina chinensis var. sargentii (A.Henry) W.C.Cheng & L.K.Fu; Sabina sargentii (A.Henry) Nakai; Juniperus sargentii var. coeruleum Pshenn.; Juniperus sargentii var. cyanus Pshenn.; Sabina pacifica Nakai

= Juniperus chinensis var. sargentii =

Variety of flowering plant

Juniperus chinensis var. sargentii, commonly known as Sargent juniper or Sargent's Chinese juniper, is a variety of Chinese juniper in the family Cupressaceae. It is a low-growing, evergreen, dioecious shrub native to parts of northeastern Asia.

Sargent juniper has a prostrate or mat-forming growth habit, with branches that may produce ascending shoots. It typically grows to about 0.5–0.6 m (1.6–2.0 ft) in height and can spread approximately 2.4–3 m (8–10 ft) wide.

The foliage is evergreen and consists of blue-green, scale-like adult leaves and juvenile, needle-like leaves arranged in whorls of three. The plant is dioecious, with male and female cones occurring on separate plants. Female plants produce fleshy, berry-like seed cones that are bluish to bluish-black when mature.

The native range of the variety includes Japan, the Kuril Islands, Sakhalin, Primorye, the Russian Far East, Korea, and Manchuria.

Sargent juniper is cultivated as an ornamental ground cover and is also used in rock gardens and as a bonsai subject. Its low, spreading habit makes it suitable for covering slopes and other areas where a ground-covering evergreen shrub is desired.
