= Premna szemaoensis =

Conservation status
- Vulnerable (IUCN 2.3)

Scientific classification
- Kingdom: Plantae
- Clade: Tracheophytes
- Clade: Angiosperms
- Clade: Eudicots
- Clade: Asterids
- Order: Lamiales
- Family: Lamiaceae
- Genus: Premna
- Species: P. szemaoensis

Binomial name
- Premna szemaoensis Pei

Species of flowering plant

Premna szemaoensis is a species of plant in the family Lamiaceae. It is endemic to China. It is threatened by habitat loss.
