= Premna protrusa =

Conservation status
- Least Concern (IUCN 2.3)

Scientific classification
- Kingdom: Plantae
- Clade: Tracheophytes
- Clade: Angiosperms
- Clade: Eudicots
- Clade: Asterids
- Order: Lamiales
- Family: Lamiaceae
- Genus: Premna
- Species: P. protrusa

Binomial name
- Premna protrusa A.C.Sm. & S.P.Darwin

Species of flowering plant

Premna protrusa is a species of plant in the family Lamiaceae. It is endemic to Fiji.
