= Marco Invernizzi =

Italian artist

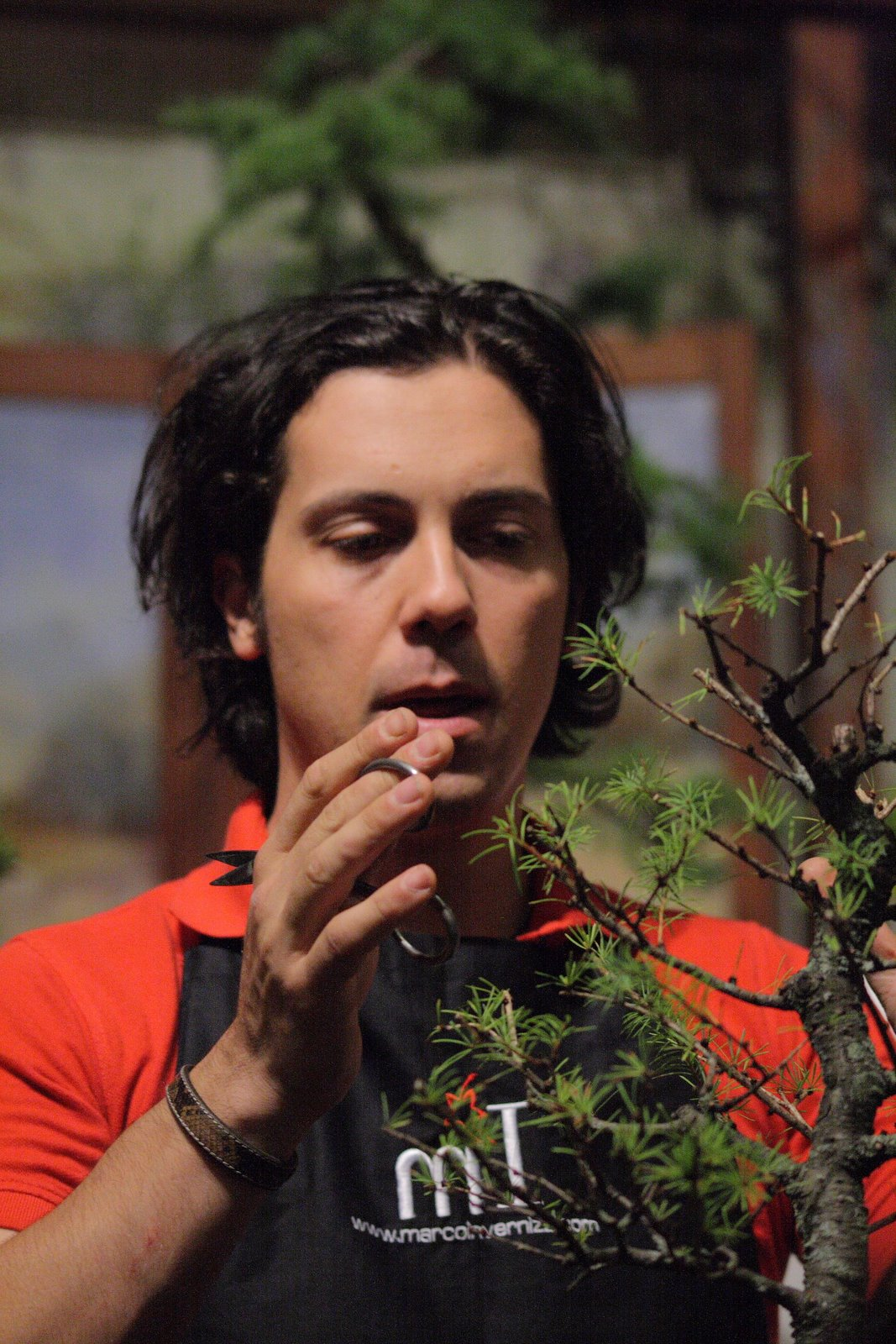
Invernizzi demonstrates bonsai styling techniques on a Japanese Larch.

Marco Invernizzi (born 7 November 1975) is an Italian bonsai artist and design consultant.

== Career ==
Invernizzi was born and raised in Milan, Italy, and studied art and design at the Istituto d'Arte Beato Angelico. He became interested in bonsai after seeing the film The Karate Kid Part III; he was struck by the scene where Mr. Miyagi "explained that the sense of life is expressed through a beautiful bonsai." In 1991 he began working with Milan bonsai artist Salvatore Liporace, with whom he studied for five years. In 1997 he completed a college degree in Graphic Design and Industrial Design, then moved to Japan for a three-year apprenticeship under bonsai master Masahiko Kimura. He was Kimura's first non-Japanese student.

Since 2000, Invernizzi has been touring internationally conducting bonsai workshops and demonstrations, including as headline demonstrator at a number of high-profile bonsai exhibitions. His work has won Best in Show at the Italian Bonsai Exhibition and the Ginkgo Bonsai Award, as well the Crespi Bonsai Cup.
