= Ryan Neil =

Ryan Neil is an American bonsai artist.

== Early life ==
Neil grew up in Colorado and went to California Polytechnic State University, San Luis Obispo, majoring in horticulture and studying Japanese.

== Career ==
He apprenticed under Japanese bonsai artist Masahiko Kimura for six years. Neil is the only westerner to complete Kimura's full apprenticeship.

After returning to the United States, he founded a bonsai business Bonsai Mirai outside of St. Helens, Oregon. Bonsai Mirai is a bonsai studio and nursery that hosts classes, trains apprentices, sells to collectors, and boards and maintains clients' bonsai. The location was chosen because of its temperate, wet climate and the availability of yamadori, trees growing in the wild that are suitable for bonsai. It houses over 800 bonsai.

Neil's bonsai were exhibited in "American Bonsai: The Unbridled Art of Ryan Neil" at the Portland Japanese Garden in 2016. Also in 2016, Ryan organized "The Artisans Cup," a juried competition of American bonsai held at the Portland Art Museum. Neil hosts the podcast Asymmetry.

Neil is featured in the 2023 HBO Documentary by Irene Taylor, "Trees and Other Entanglements."

== Personal life ==
Neil has a son.
