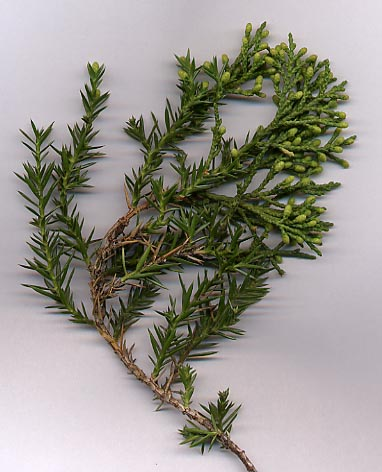
- Chinese juniper shoot, showing juvenile (needle-like) leaves, adult scale leaves, and young male cones

Conservation status
- Least Concern (IUCN 3.1)

Scientific classification
- Kingdom: Plantae
- Clade: Embryophytes
- Clade: Tracheophytes
- Clade: Gymnosperms
- Division: Pinophyta
- Class: Pinopsida
- Order: Cupressales
- Family: Cupressaceae
- Genus: Juniperus
- Section: Juniperus sect. Sabina
- Species: J. chinensis

Binomial name
- Juniperus chinensis L.

Varieties
- Juniperus chinensis var. chinensis; Juniperus chinensis var. sargentii

= Juniperus chinensis =

Species of conifer

Juniperus chinensis, the Chinese juniper, is a species of plant in the cypress family Cupressaceae, native to China, Myanmar, Japan, Korea and the Russian Far East. Growing 1–20 metres (3 1/2–65 1/2 feet) tall, it is a very variable coniferous evergreen tree or shrub.

A variety of Juniperus chinensis referred to as "Shimpaku" is one of the top species used in the Japanese art of bonsai. Among the multiple cultivars of Shimpaku found in Japan, the most desirable due to its tight, fine foliage and excellent growing habits, is the "Itoigawa" variety.

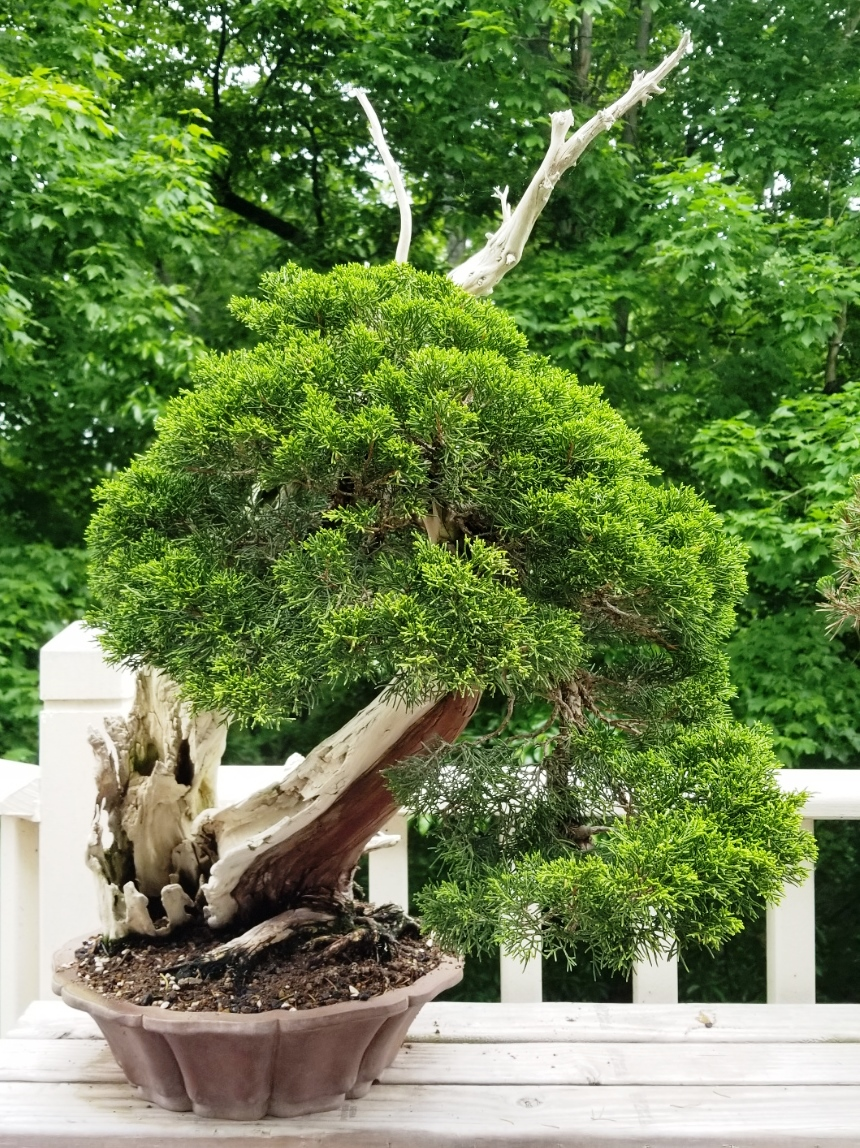
Juniper bonsai grafted with Itoigawa foliage. This tree is estimated to be 150–250 years old.

== Growth ==
The leaves grow in two forms, juvenile needle-like leaves 5–10 millimetres (1/4–3/8 inch) long, and adult scale-leaves 1.5–3 mm long. Mature trees usually continue to bear some juvenile foliage as well as adult, particularly on shaded shoots low in the crown. This species is often dioecious (either male or female plants), but some individual plants produce both sexes of flowers. The blue-black berry-like cones grow to 7–12 mm in diameter, have a whitish waxy bloom, and contain 2–4 seeds; they mature in about 18 months. The male cones, 2–4 mm long, shed their pollen in early spring.

== Cultivation and uses ==
This popular ornamental tree or shrub for gardens, parks, and in tough coastal conditions of hot sun and sandy fast-draining soils, has more than 100 named cultivars selected for various characteristics, such as yellow foliage (e.g. cvs. 'Aurea', 'Tremonia'), permanently juvenile foliage (e.g. cv. 'Shoosmith'), columnar crown shape (cv. 'Columnaris'), abundant cones, spiral branch pattern (e.g. cv. 'Kaizuka'), etc. First popular in the United States in the Los Angeles gardens in Mediterranean style homes, and now commonly found along both the West and East Coast in beach and coastal areas.

The Chinese juniper is widely used in bonsai, both as individual plants, such as the 250-year-old "Omiya tree" in the Birmingham Botanical Gardens in the UK, and in groups, such as the well-known Goshin on display at the National Bonsai and Penjing Museum at the US National Arboretum. The cultivar 'Shimpaku' is a very important bonsai subject.

=== AGM cultivars ===
The following cultivars have gained the Royal Horticultural Society's Award of Garden Merit:

- 'Aurea' (golden Chinese juniper)
- 'Blaauw'
- 'Grey Owl'
- 'Kaizuka'
- 'Plumosa Aurea'
- 'Pyramidalis'

=== Juniperus × pfitzeriana ===
The hybrid between Juniperus chinensis and Juniperus sabina, known as Juniperus × pfitzeriana (Pfitzer juniper, synonym J. × media), is also very common as a cultivated plant. This hybrid grows only as a shrub, never a tree, making it suitable for smaller gardens:

- 'Old Gold'
- 'Sulphur Spray'

== Gallery ==
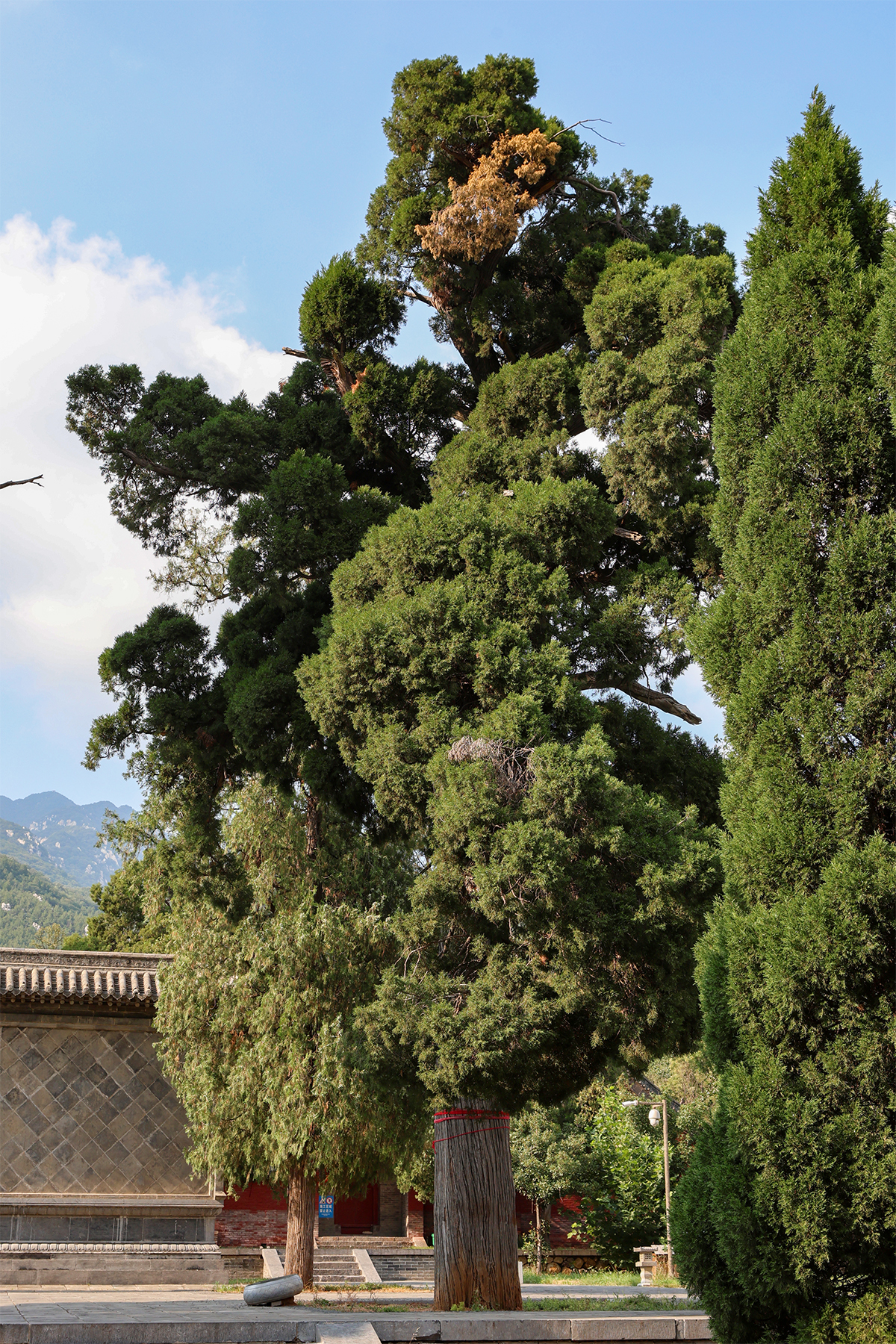
A mature specimen at Huishan temple.

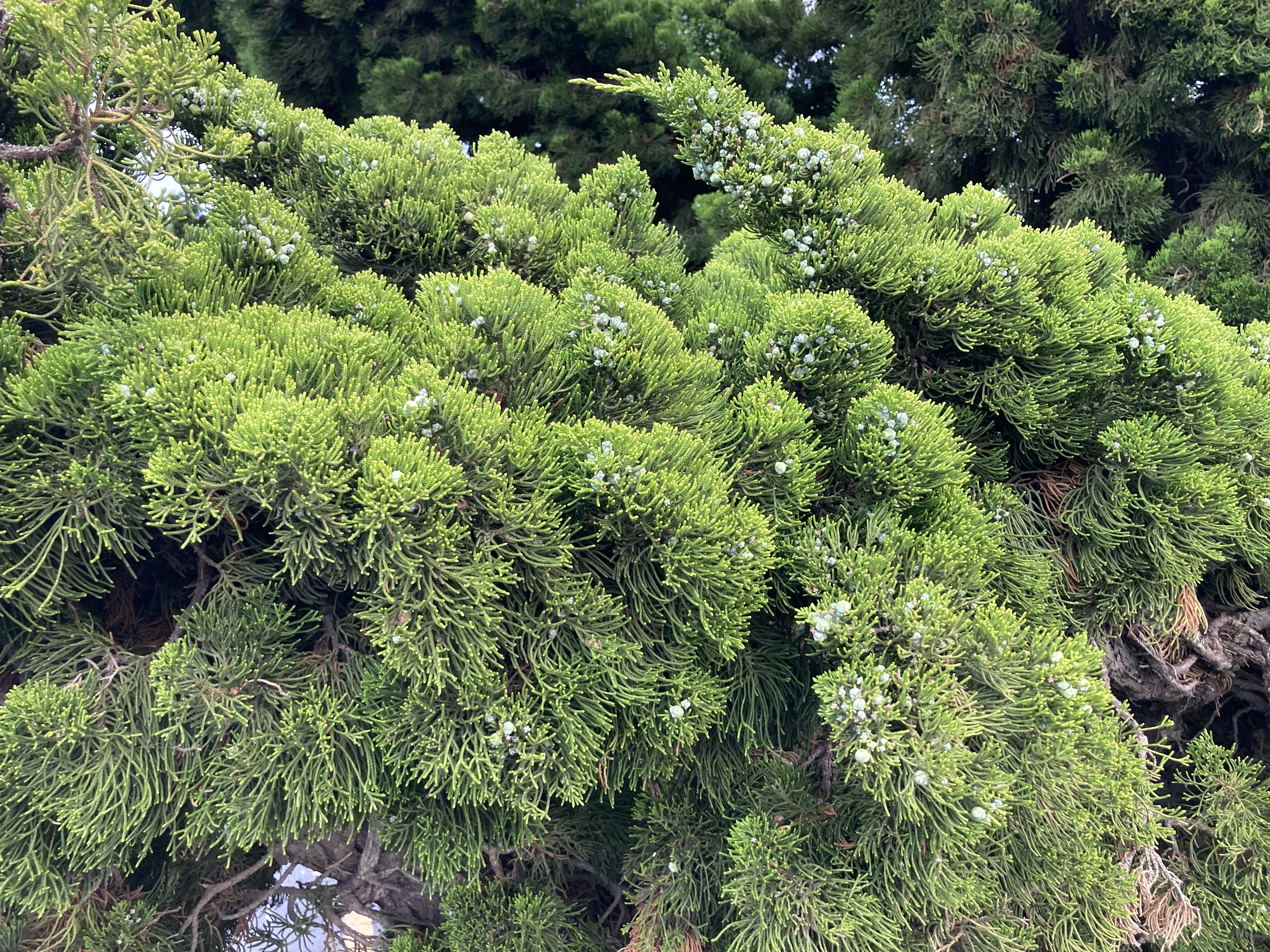
Detail of the foliage

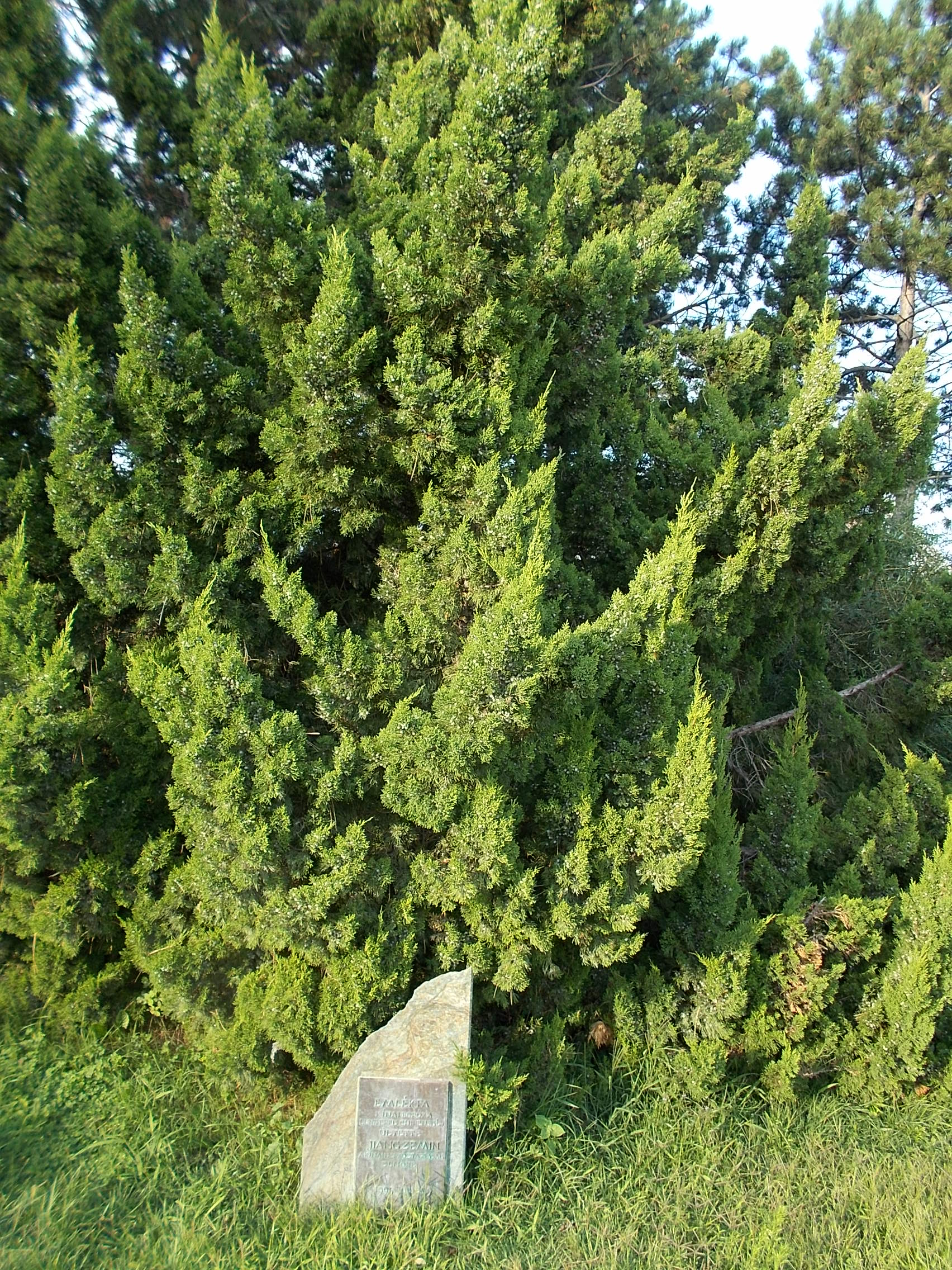
A tree showing off the foliage in Hungary

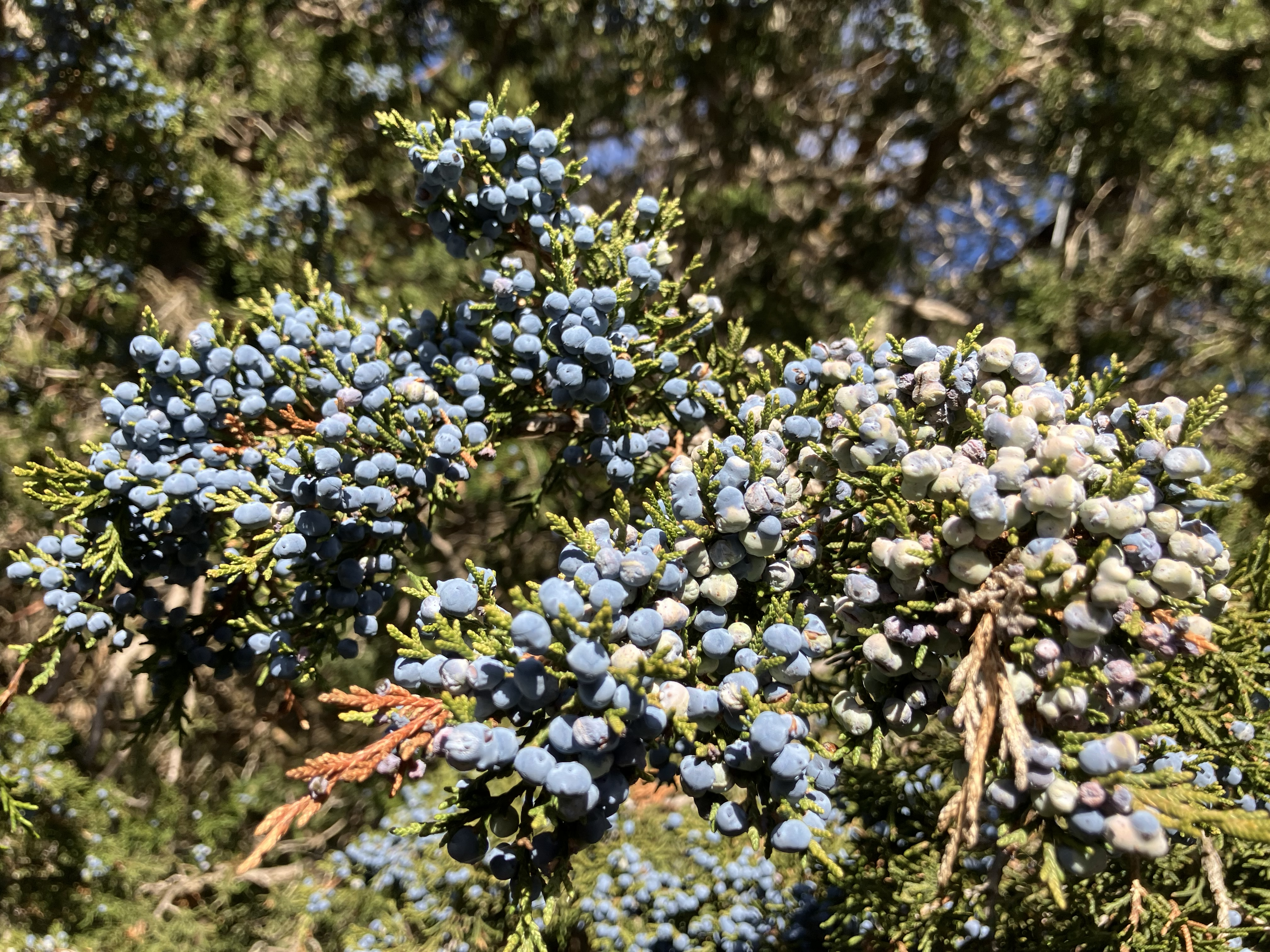
The fruits

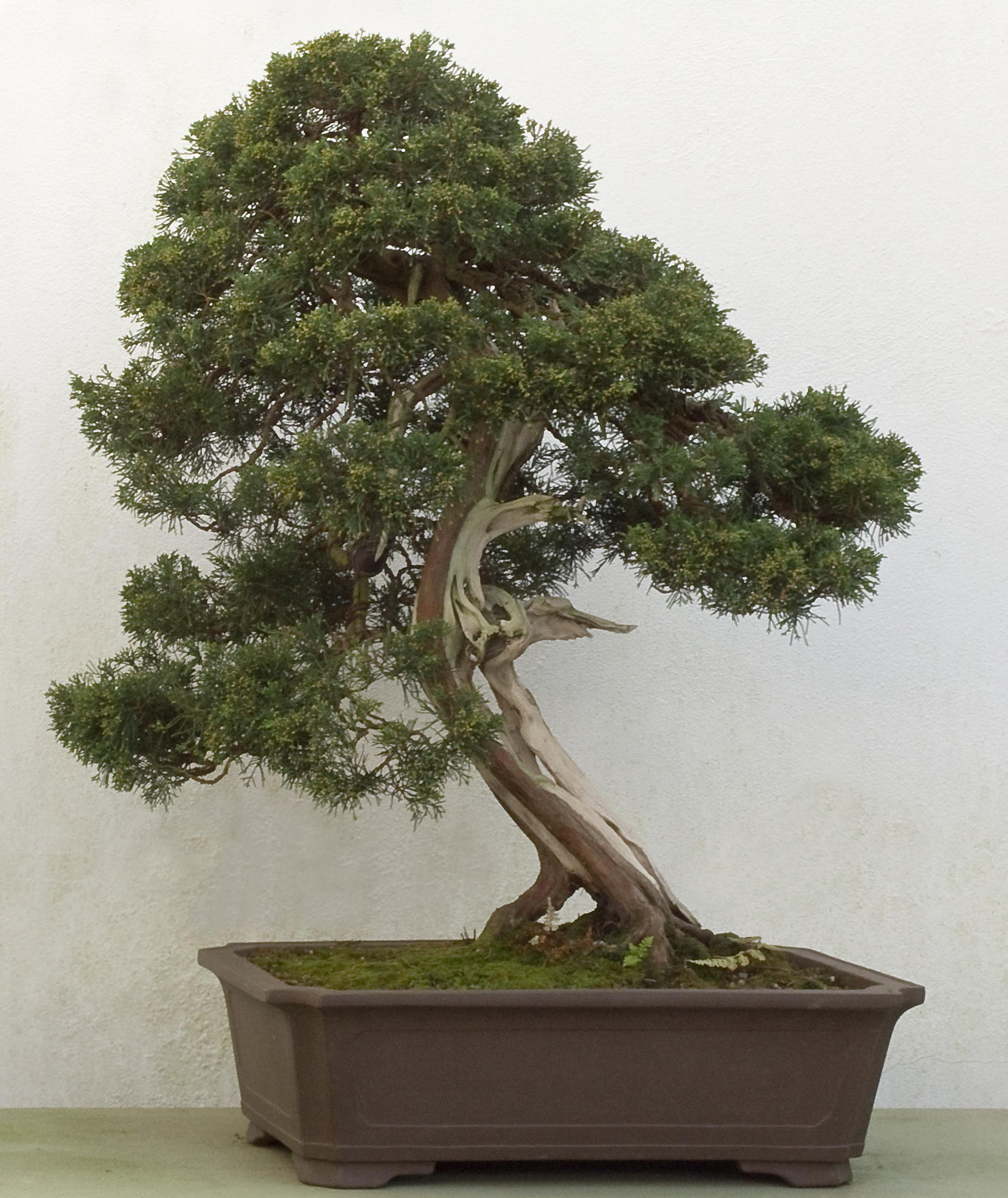
As a 250-year-old bonsai in the Birmingham Botanical Gardens

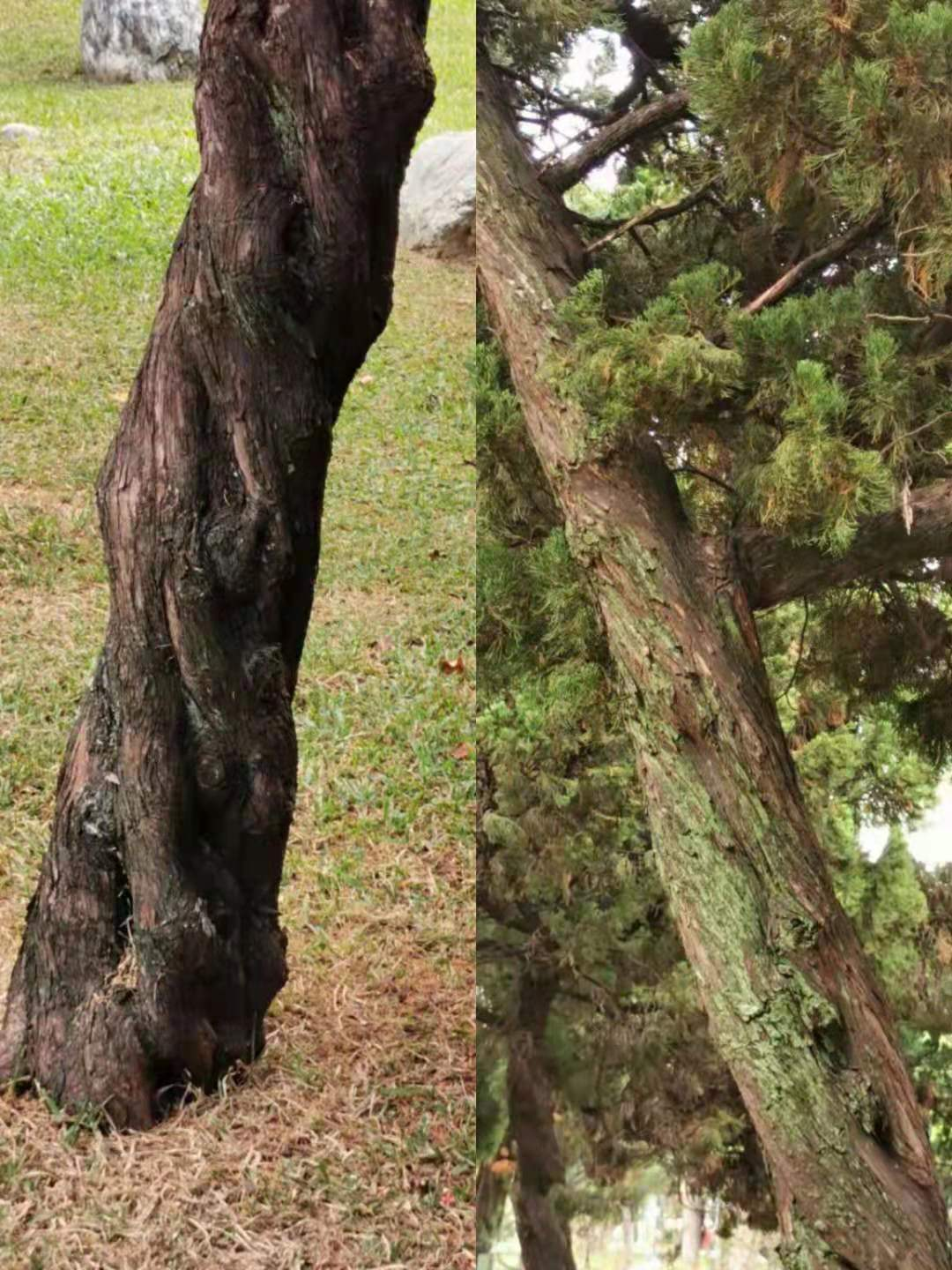
Juniperus chinensis var. kaizuka

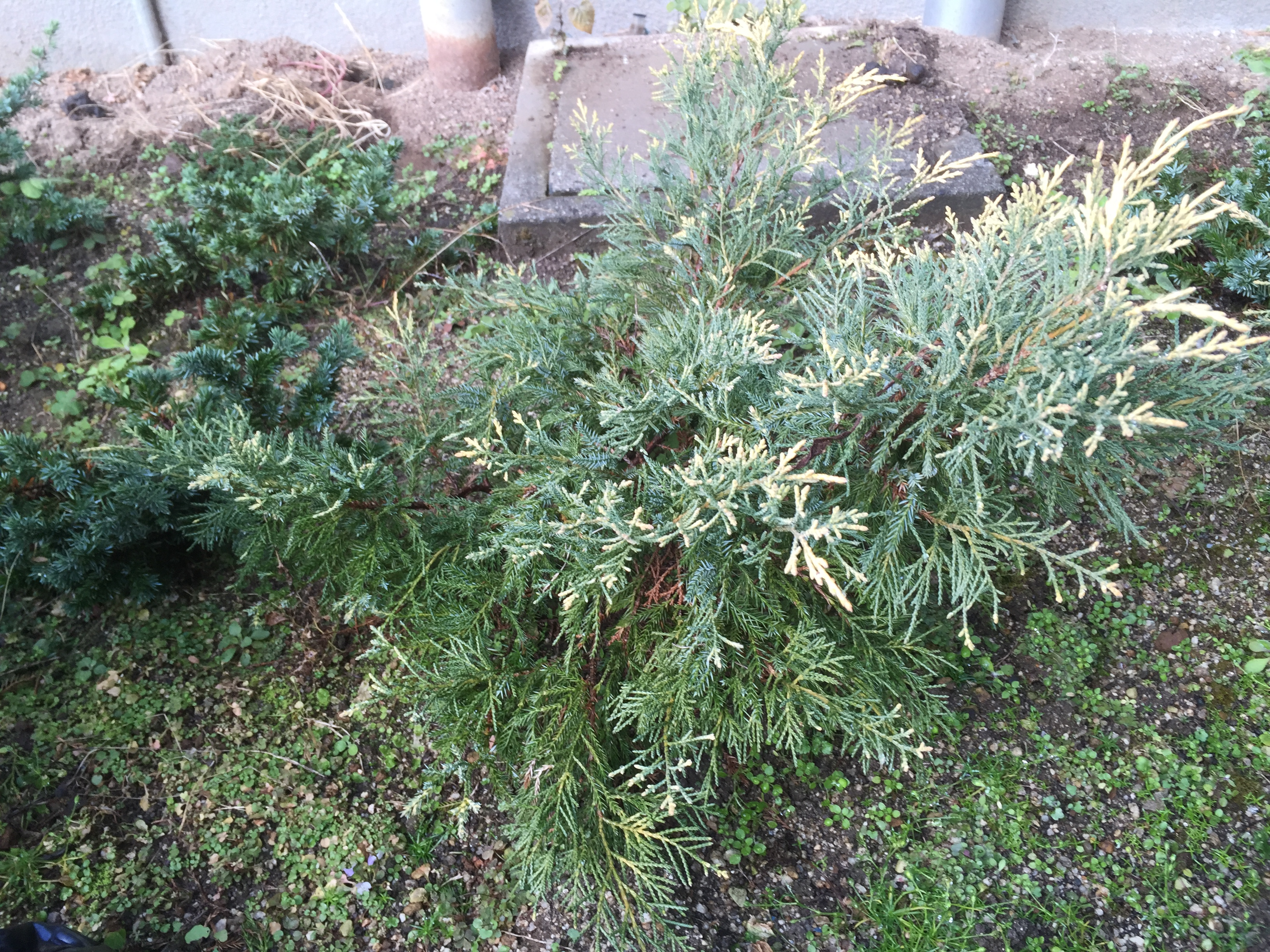
J. × pfitzeriana 'Old Gold'

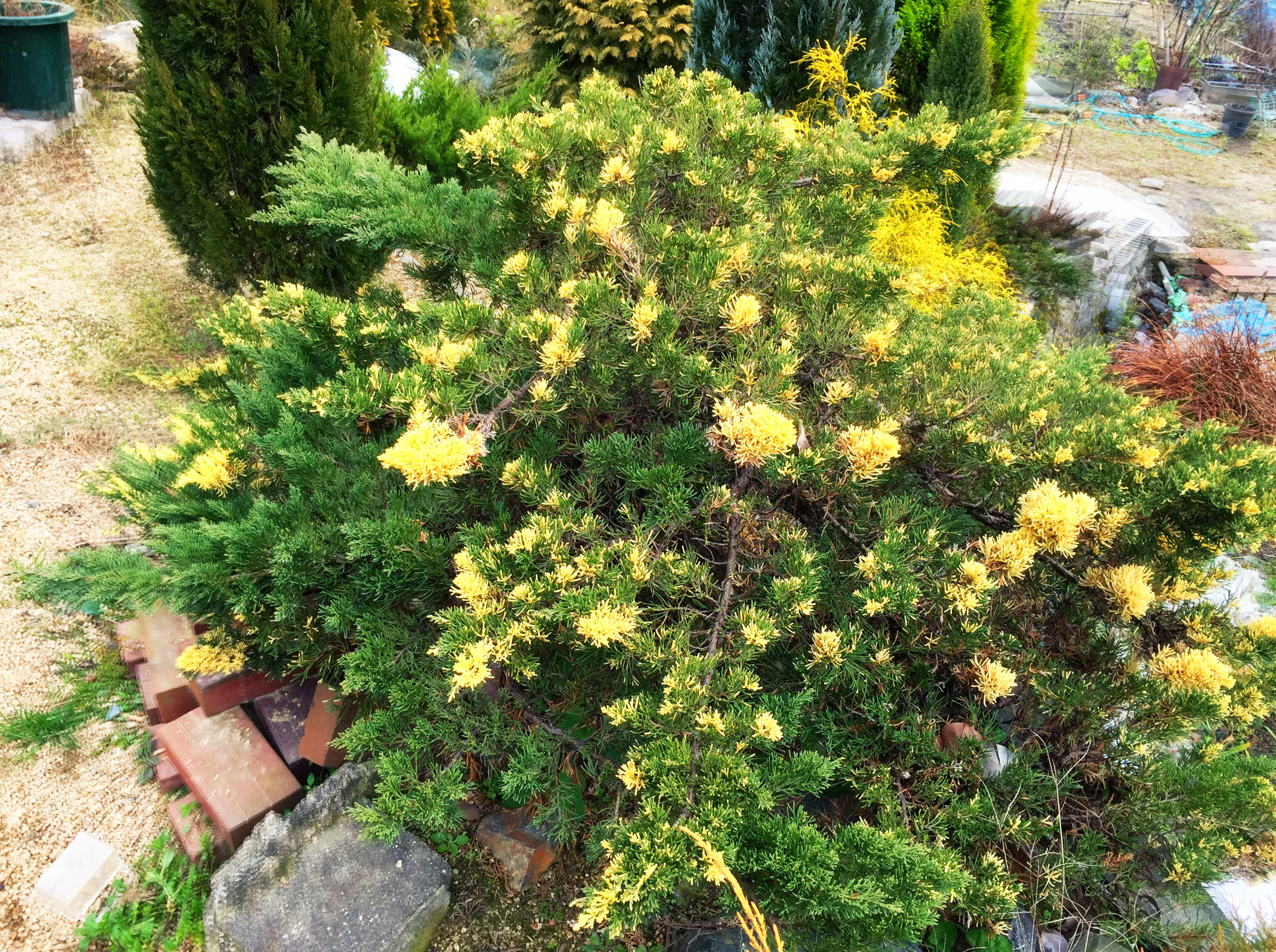
Variegated variety J. chinensis 'Expansa Variegata'
