= Premna grandifolia =

Conservation status
- Vulnerable (IUCN 2.3)

Scientific classification
- Kingdom: Plantae
- Clade: Tracheophytes
- Clade: Angiosperms
- Clade: Eudicots
- Clade: Asterids
- Order: Lamiales
- Family: Lamiaceae
- Genus: Premna
- Species: P. grandifolia

Binomial name
- Premna grandifolia A.D.J. Meeuse

Species of shrub

Premna grandifolia is a small shrub in the family Lamiaceae. It is endemic to Ivory Coast. It is threatened by habitat loss.
