= Juniperus chinensis 'Shimpaku' =

Dwarf form of Chinese juniper plant

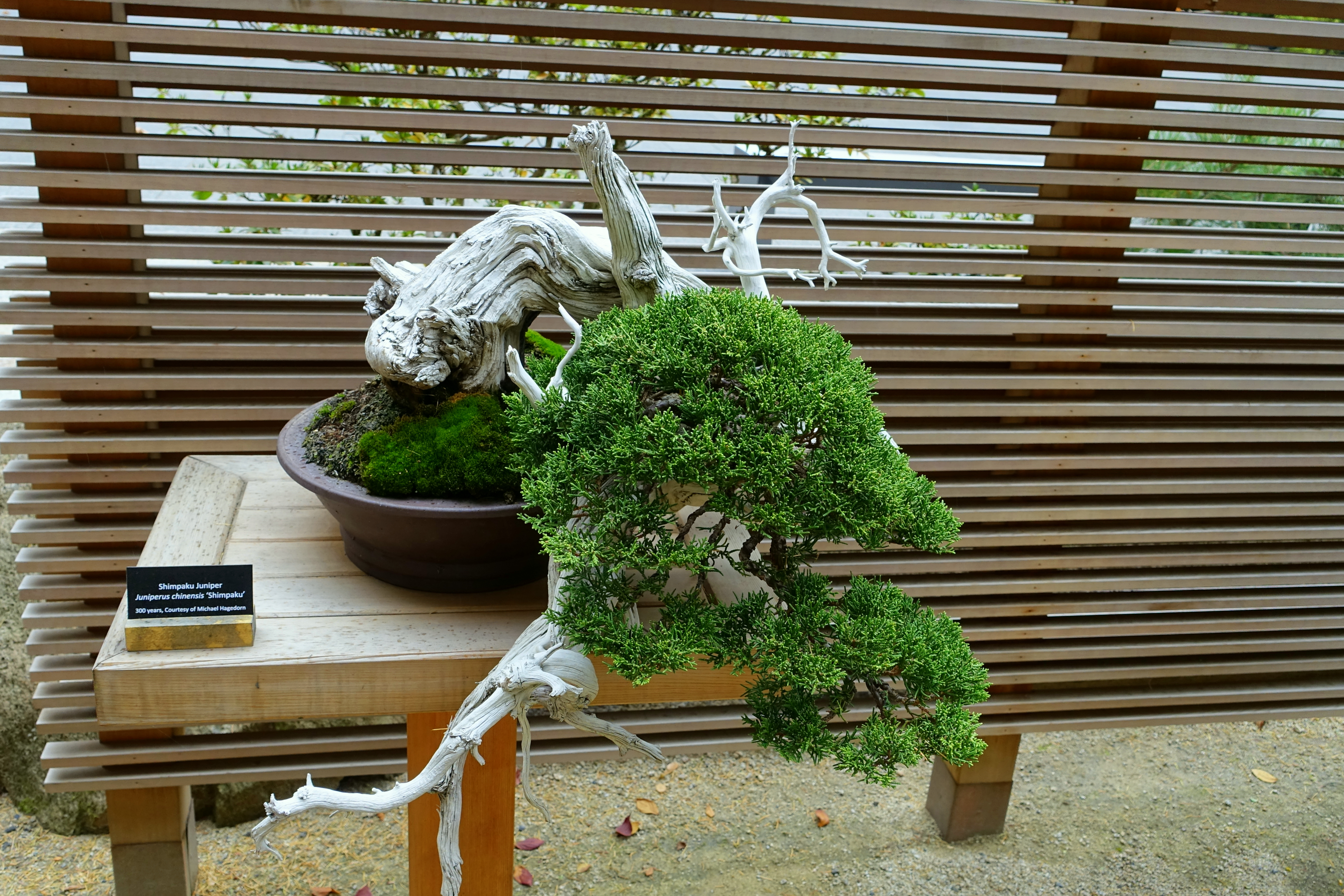
- Species: Juniperus chinensis
- Cultivar: 'Shimpaku'
- Origin: Japan

Juniperus chinensis 'Shimpaku' (the shimpaku juniper) is a dwarf, irregular vase-shaped form of the Chinese juniper, Juniperus chinensis. Originally native to Japan, they were first collected in the 1850s in Japan. It is a slow-growing evergreen shrub that typically grows to 3 ft (0.9 m) tall and 5 ft (1.5 m) wide over a period of 10 years. Gray-green to dull dark green clusters of soft needles cover them. They are primarily grown and used as decoration, and at one point were a symbol of status in Japan. The Japanese botanical name of the shimpaku juniper is miyama-byakushin. The shimpaku juniper is used as bonsai material and in various gardens, such as rock gardens.

== Bonsai ==
Shimpaku juniper are one of the most popular species for bonsai in the bonsai community. Its attractive foliage and beautiful bark make this one of the top candidates for bonsai. Many wild trees have been collected in Japan, making it extremely rare to find growing wild. In fact, today the shimpaku junipers growing in the wild in Japan face extinction due to over collecting. Shimpaku was and is very dangerous to collect. Many of the best shimpaku live only in remote cliff areas. It is said that the first shimpaku to be collected in the wild came from the Ishizuchi mountain range on Shikoku Island. Collected shimpaku are known for their deadwood, called jin and shari in the bonsai community. Many bonsai masterpieces are shimpaku junipers. Masahiko Kimura is known for having many outstanding shimpaku.

== Gardening information ==
Zone: 3 to 9
Plant Type: Needled evergreen
Family: Cupressaceae
Height: 1 to 3 ft (0.30 to 0.91 m)
Spread: 1 to 5 ft (0.30 to 1.52 m)
Sun: Full sun
Water: Medium
Maintenance: Low

== Cultivars ==
Itoigawa
Kishu
