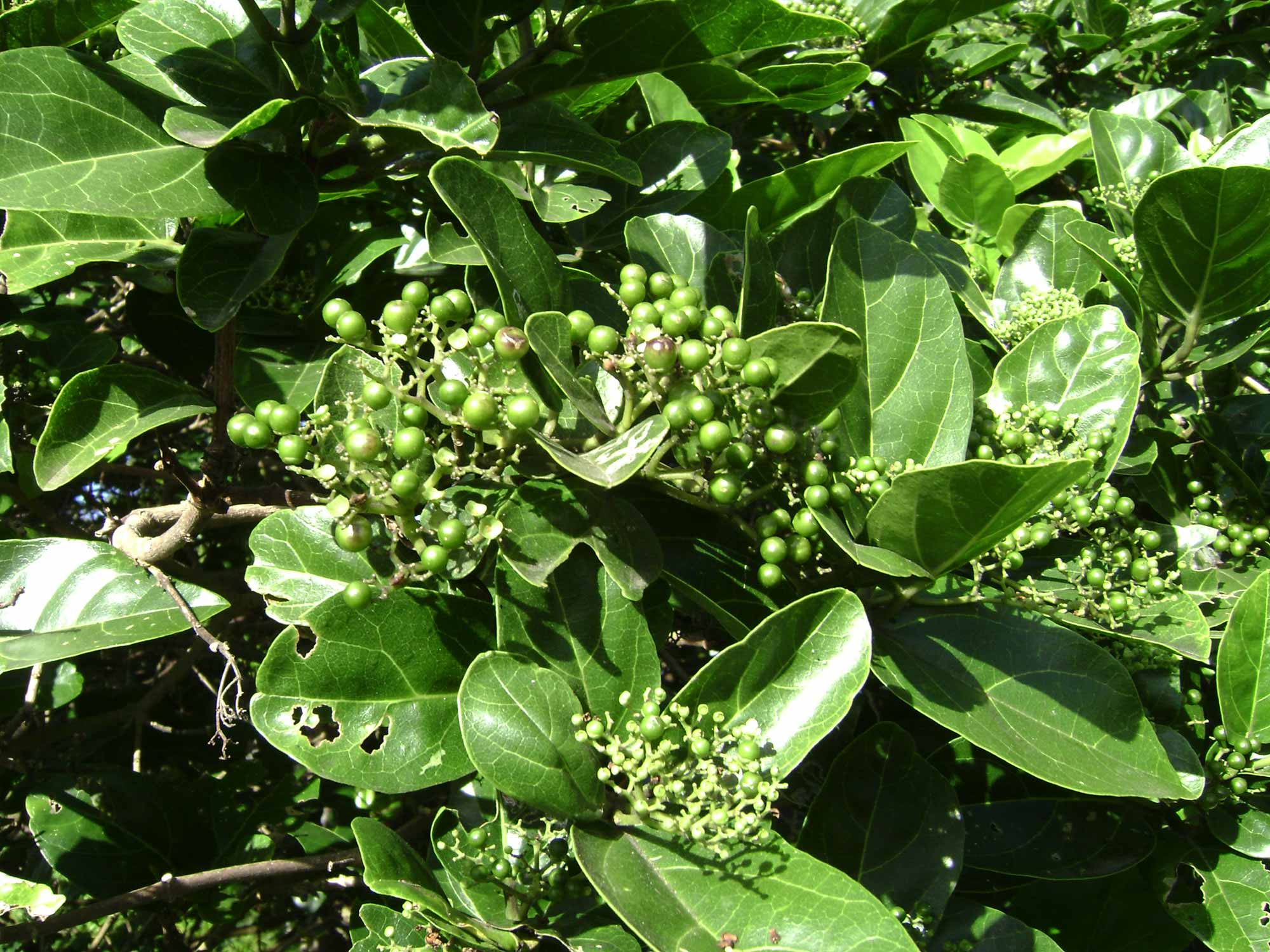
- Leaves and young fruit
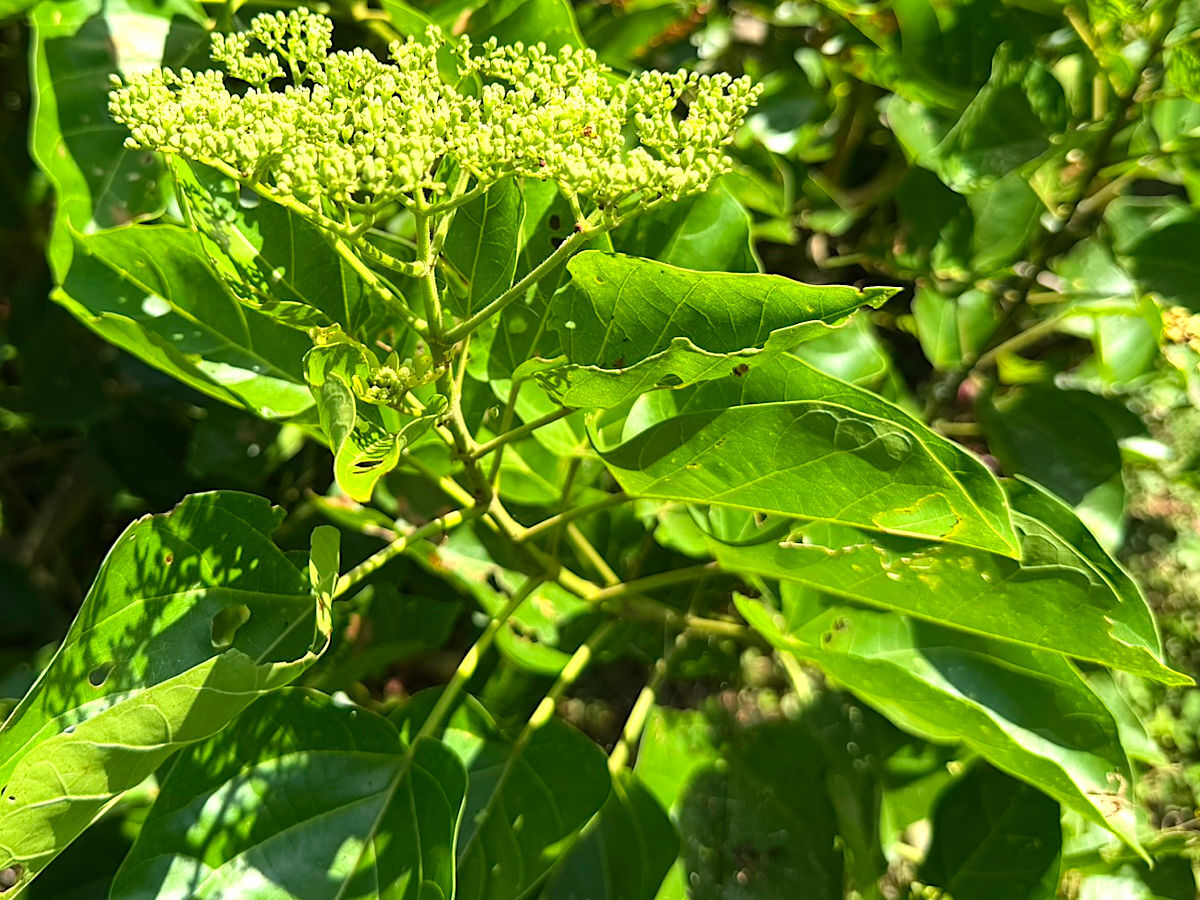
- Inflorescence

Conservation status
- Least Concern (IUCN 3.1)

Scientific classification
- Kingdom: Plantae
- Clade: Tracheophytes
- Clade: Angiosperms
- Clade: Eudicots
- Clade: Asterids
- Order: Lamiales
- Family: Lamiaceae
- Genus: Premna
- Species: P. serratifolia

Binomial name
- Premna serratifolia L.

Synonyms
- List: Premna obtusifolia f. serratifolia (L.) Moldenke; Premna obtusifolia var. serratifolia (L.) Moldenke; Cornutia corymbosa Burm.f.; Gumira abbreviata (Miq.) Kuntze; Gumira attenuata (R.Br.) Kuntze; Gumira ceramensis (Miq.) Kuntze; Gumira cyclophylla (Miq.) Kuntze; Gumira dallachyana (Benth.) Kuntze; Gumira divaricata (Wall. ex Schauer) Kuntze; Gumira domestica Hassk.; Gumira foetida (Reinw. ex Blume) Hassk.; Gumira integrifolia Hassk.; Gumira laevigata (Miq.) Kuntze; Gumira limbata (Benth.) Kuntze; Gumira nauseosa (Blanco) Kuntze; Gumira nitida (K.Schum.) Kuntze; Gumira opulifolia (Miq.) Kuntze; Gumira punctulata (C.B.Clarke) Kuntze; Gumira truncata (Turcz.) Kuntze; Premna abbreviata Miq.; Premna acuminatissima Merr.; Premna angustior (C.B.Clarke) Ridl.; Premna arborea Farw.; Premna atra Merr.; Premna attenuata R.Br.; Premna benguetensis C.B.Rob.; Premna benthamiana Domin; Premna borneensis H.J.Lam; Premna brongersmae H.J.Lam; Premna capitata A.Meeuse; Premna ceramensis Miq.; Premna congesta Merr.; Premna corymbosa (Burm.f.) Schauer; Premna corymbosa var. madagascariensis Moldenke; Premna corymbosa var. minor (Ridl.) H.R.Fletcher; Premna corymbosa var. obtusifolia (R.Br.) H.R.Fletcher; Premna corymbosa var. sambucina (Wall. ex Schauer) Moldenke; Premna cyclophylla Miq.; Premna dallachyana Benth.; Premna dallachyana var. obtusisepala Domin; Premna dallachyana var. typica Domin in Repert.; Premna dentatifolia Moldenke; Premna divaricata Wall. ex Schauer; Premna foetida Reinw. ex Blume; Premna gaudichaudii Schauer; Premna glabra A.Gray ex Maxim.; Premna glandulifera Merr.; Premna glandulosa Merr.; Premna glycycocca F.Muell.; Premna guillauminii var. serrata Moldenke; Premna hircina Wall.; Premna integrifolia L.; Premna integrifolia Willd.; Premna integrifolia var. angustior C.B.Clarke; Premna integrifolia subsp. dentatolabium H.J.Lam; Premna integrifolia var. minor Ridl.; Premna integrifolia var. obtusifolia (R.Br.) C.Pei; Premna integrifolia subsp. truncatolabium H.J.Lam; Premna kunstleri King & Gamble; Premna laevigata Miq.; Premna lamii Moldenke; Premna leucostoma Náves ex Fern.-Vill.; Premna leytensis Merr.; Premna limbata Benth.; Premna lucidula Kurz; Premna macrophylla H.J.Lam; Premna media R.Br.; Premna membranifolia Merr.; Premna nauseosa Blanco; Premna nitida K.Schum.; Premna obtusifolia R.Br.; Premna obtusifolia var. angustior (C.B.Clarke) Moldenke; Premna obtusifolia var. gaudichaudii (Schauer) Moldenke; Premna obtusifolia var. madagascariensis (Moldenke) Moldenke; Premna obtusifolia var. minor (Ridl.) Moldenke; Premna obtusifolia var. pubescens Moldenke; Premna obtusifolia var. velutina Benth.; Premna octonervia Merr. & F.P.Metcalf; Premna opulifolia Miq.; Premna ovata R.Br.; Premna paniculata H.R.Fletcher; Premna papuana Wernham; Premna parviflora H.J.Lam; Premna perrottetii C.B.Clarke; Premna populifolia Miq.; Premna punctulata C.B.Clarke; Premna sambucina Wall. ex Schauer; Premna serratifolia var. minor (Ridl.) A.Rajendran & P.Daniel; Premna spinosa Roxb.; Premna subcordata Turcz.; Premna subglabra Merr.; Premna sumatrana Ridl.; Premna syringifolia Zipp. ex H.J.Lam & Bakh.; Premna tahitensis var. rapensis F.Br.; Premna tahitensis var. rimatarensis F.Br.; Premna tateana F.M.Bailey; Premna tiliifolia Zipp. ex H.J.Lam & Bakh.; Premna timoriana Decne.; Premna truncata Turcz.; Premna woodii Moldenke; Premna wrayi King & Gamble; Scrophularioides arborea G.Forst.; Citharexylum paniculatum Poir.; Viburnum chinense Hook. & Arn.

= Premna serratifolia =

Species of flowering plant

Premna serratifolia is a species of small tree or shrub in the family Lamiaceae. It blooms and fruits between May and November. During flowering season, it attracts a large number of butterflies and bees.

== Habitat ==
It mostly grows in moist sandy soil and scrub jungles along seacoasts and mangrove forests. In the Philippines, particularly in Cebu Island, it is usually found in the interior, watery forests of Southern Cebu.

== Description ==
Trees, to 7 m high. Leaves simple, opposite, estipulate; petiole 4–14 mm, slender, pubescent, grooved above; lamina 2.5-8.5 x 2–7.2 cm, elliptic, elliptic-oblong, base acute, obtuse, subcordate or rounded, apex acuminate, mucronate, obtuse, margin entire or subserrate, glabrous above except along the appressed midrib, chartaceous; lateral nerves 3-5 pair, pinnate, prominent, puberulous beneath; intercostae reticulate, obscure. Flowers bisexual, greenish-white, in terminal corymbose panicled cymes; bracts small; calyx small campanulate, 2 lipped, 5 lobed; corolla tube short, villous inside, lobes 5; stamens 4, didynamous, inserted below the throat of the corolla tube; anther ovate; ovary superior, 2-4-celled, ovules 4; style linear; stigma shortly bifid. Fruit a drupe, seated on the calyx, globose, purple; seeds oblong.

== Medicinal uses ==
The plant is extensively used in Indian traditional medicine. Studies on the root wood of P. serratifolia led to the isolation of acteoside, a glucoside derivative. The root bark of the plant which showed biological activities have also shown to contain a potent cytotoxic and antioxidant diterpene, 11,12,16-trihydroxy-2-oxo-5-methyl-10-demethyl-abieta-1[10],6, 8,11,13-pentene.

== Culinary uses ==
In Vietnam, the aromatic leaves of P. serratifolia are used to cook in some braise or stir fry dishes with chicken, eels or frogs.
