= Masahiko Kimura (bonsai artist) =

Japanese bonsai artist (born 1940)

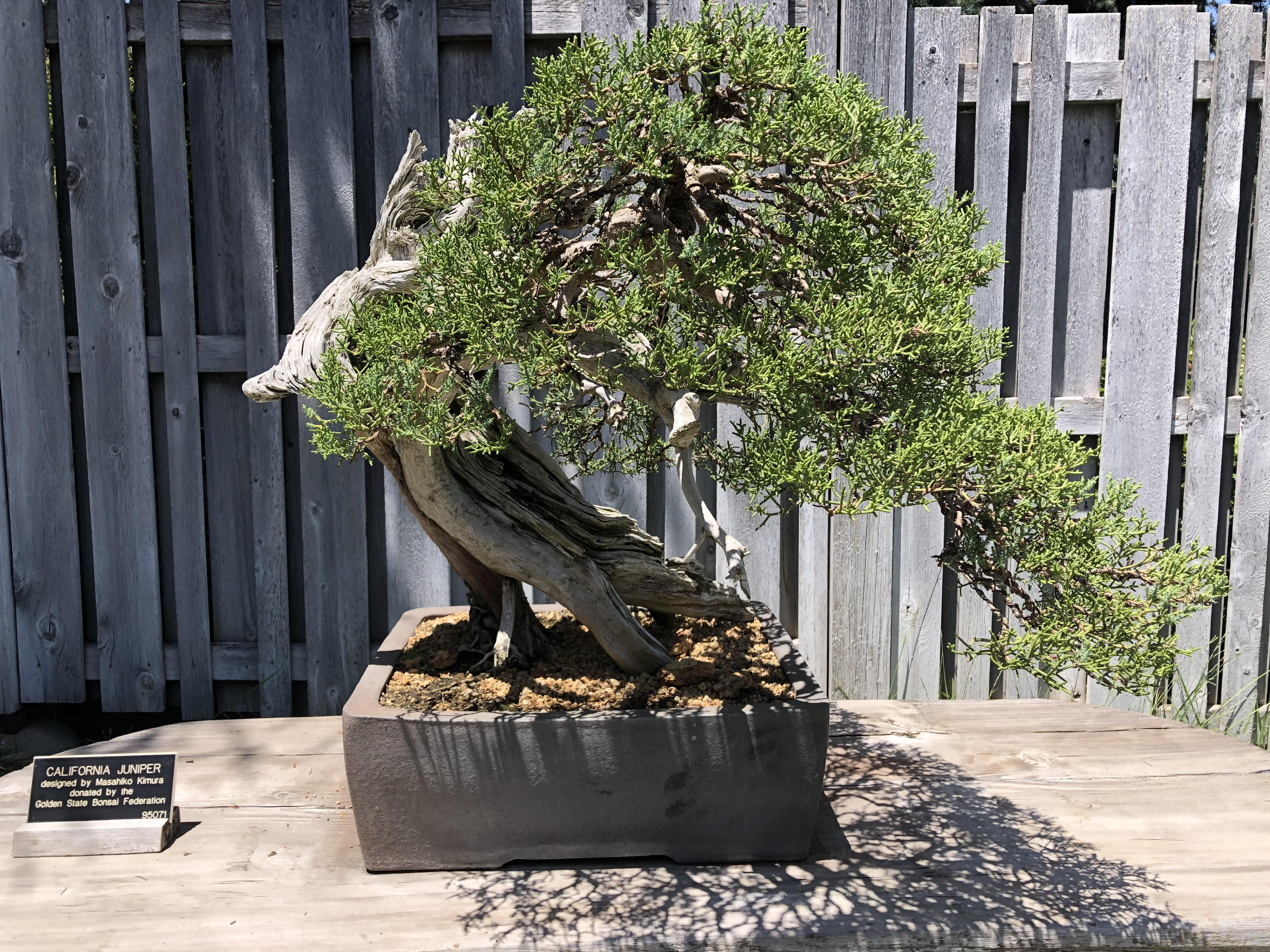
- A California juniper designed by Kimura, in the Bonsai Courts of the Huntington Library
- Born: 1940 (age 85–86); Ōmiya-ku, Saitama, Japan
- Known for: Bonsai

Masahiko Kimura (木村 正彦, Kimura Masahiko; 1940-) is a Japanese bonsai artist, born in Ōmiya-ku, Saitama on March 31, 1940.

== Career ==
When Kimura was 11, his father died. Kimura wanted to be a rock and roll musician as a teenager, but at age 15, following the wishes of his mother, he started an apprenticeship at Toju-en Bonsai Garden, under master Motosuke Hamano. His apprenticeship lasted eleven years.

Nowadays, Kimura is regarded as a genius and innovator in the bonsai world. He specializes in shimpaku junipers. His trees are known for their intricate deadwood features and their harsh, stark features; this modern style is very demanding on trees, which must be dramatically bent and twisted. Within the bonsai community, he has become known as the "Magical Technician of Kindai Shuppan".

Kimura has done presentations and demonstrations around the world, and his work has appeared in numerous bonsai publications. He won the Prime Minister's Award for the years 1988, 1995, 2000, and 2001, and the Minister of Education Award in 1999. His past apprentices include Marco Invernizzi, Salvatore Liporace, Ernie Kuo, Marc Noelanders, Kawabe Takeo, and Ryan Neil.

=== Published works ===
Katsuhito Onishi edited the Japanese texts The Magical Technician of Kindai Shuppan in 1982, Part II in 1984, and Part III in 1989. The English version, made up of Part II with some of Part I, was published as The Bonsai Art of Kimura by Stone Lantern Publishing Co. in 1992. The Magician: the Bonsai Art of Kimura 2 was released in 2007 by Stone Lantern. A Spanish translation, Masahiko Kimura: el técnico mágico del bonsai actual was published in 1988 by Ediciones Tyris, S.A., His 9-video 4-hour "Kimura Master Class" course was made available by Bonsai Empire in 2020.
