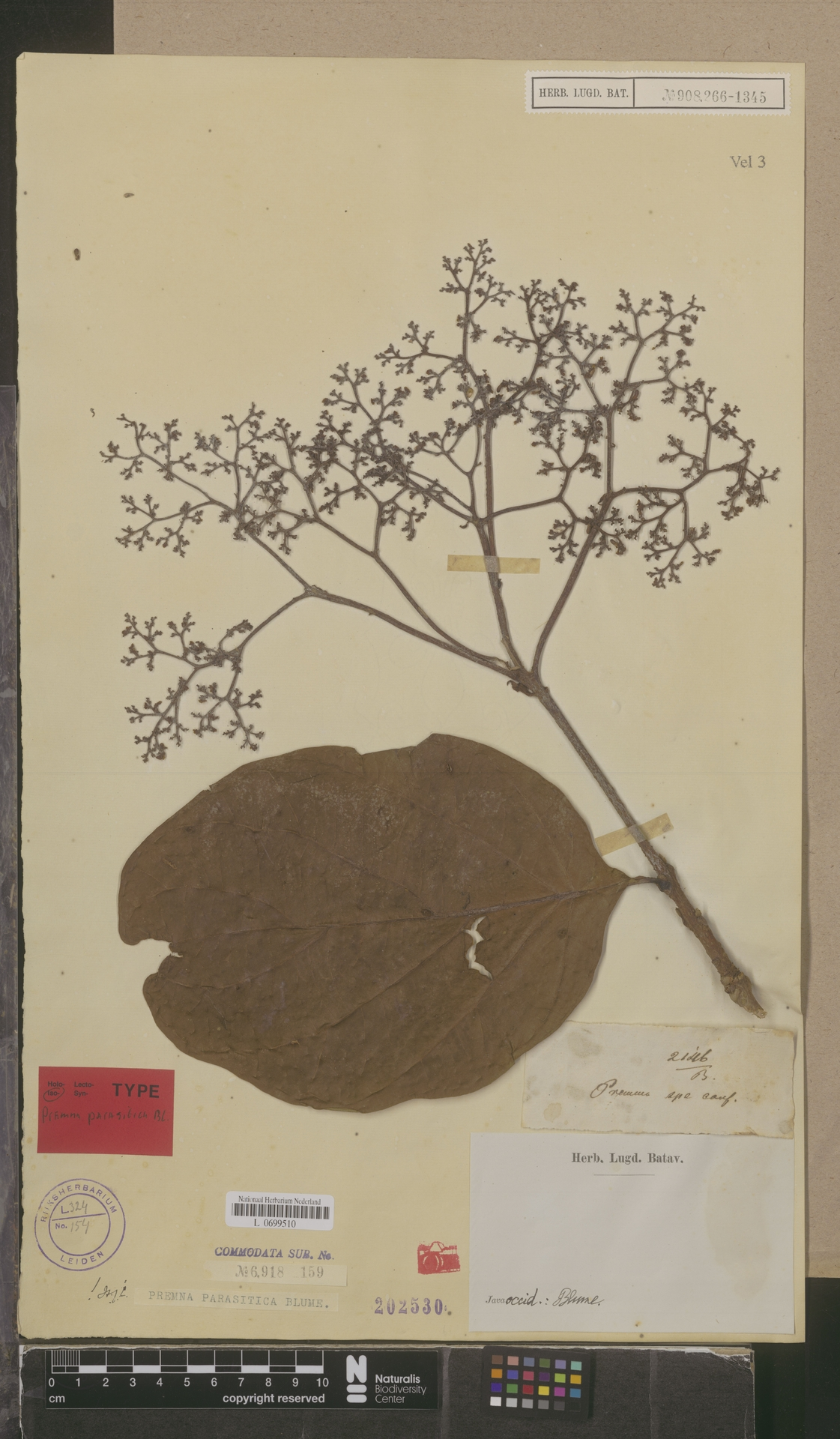
- Premna parasitica isotype herbarium specimen

Scientific classification
- Kingdom: Plantae
- Clade: Embryophytes
- Clade: Tracheophytes
- Clade: Angiosperms
- Clade: Eudicots
- Clade: Asterids
- Order: Lamiales
- Family: Lamiaceae
- Genus: Premna
- Species: P. parasitica

Binomial name
- Premna parasitica Blume

Synonyms
- Gumira parasitica (Blume) Hassk.

= Premna parasitica =

Species of flowering plant

Premna parasitica is a species of flowering plant in the family Lamiaceae, native to Java and Bali, Indonesia. Its fruit is readily consumed by the Sunda Island leaf monkey, Presbytis comata.
