= List of Chrysobothris species =

This is a list of 698 species in Chrysobothris, a genus of metallic wood-boring beetles in the family Buprestidae.

== Chrysobothris species ==
- Chrysobothris abyssinica Fairmaire, 1891^{c g}
- Chrysobothris acaciae Knull, 1936^{i c g b}
- Chrysobothris achardi Obenberger, 1922^{c g}
- Chrysobothris acutipennis Chevrolat, 1835^{i c g b}
- Chrysobothris adelpha Harold, 1869^{i c g b}
- Chrysobothris aeneicollis Deyrolle, 1864^{c g}
- Chrysobothris aeneifrons Fairmaire, 1882^{c g}
- Chrysobothris aeneola LeConte, 1860^{i c g}
- Chrysobothris aequalis Waterhouse, 1889^{c g}
- Chrysobothris aerea Chevrolat, 1834^{c g}
- Chrysobothris affinis (Fabricius, 1794)^{c g}
- Chrysobothris alabamae Gory, 1841
- Chrysobothris alabamaegory , 1841^{c g}
- Chrysobothris alecto Obenberger, 1917^{c g}
- Chrysobothris algoensis Obenberger, 1922^{c g}
- Chrysobothris alluaudi Kerremans, 1914^{c g}
- Chrysobothris alutaceiventris Obenberger, 1940^{c g}
- Chrysobothris amazonica Kerremans, 1897^{c g}
- Chrysobothris amberestris Bellamy, 1999^{c g}
- Chrysobothris amplicollis Thomson, 1879^{c g}
- Chrysobothris amurensis Pic, 1904^{c g}
- Chrysobothris analis LeConte, 1860^{i c g b}
- Chrysobothris andamana Kerremans, 1891^{c g}
- Chrysobothris andica Obenberger, 1928^{c g}
- Chrysobothris andrewsi Waterhouse, 1900^{c g}
- Chrysobothris andrusi Baudon, 1968^{c g}
- Chrysobothris angolae Obenberger, 1922^{c g}
- Chrysobothris angulipicta Kerremans, 1903^{c g}
- Chrysobothris anniae Obenberger, 1928^{c g}
- Chrysobothris anoguttata (Gory, 1841)^{c g}
- Chrysobothris antillarum Fisher, 1925^{c g}
- Chrysobothris antiqua Chevrolat, 1838^{c g}
- Chrysobothris apicalis Kerremans, 1900^{c g}
- Chrysobothris apolinari Obenberger, 1932^{c g}
- Chrysobothris ardoini Baudon, 1963^{c g}
- Chrysobothris arizonica Chamberlin, 1938^{i c g}
- Chrysobothris armata Dugès, 1891^{c g}
- Chrysobothris arnoldi Thery, 1932^{c g}
- Chrysobothris arouensis Deyrolle, 1864^{c g}
- Chrysobothris astartae Abeille de Perrin, 1895^{c g}
- Chrysobothris astuta Waterhouse, 1887^{c g}
- Chrysobothris atabalipa Gory & Laporte, 1837^{c g}
- Chrysobothris atahualpa Obenberger, 1928^{c g}
- Chrysobothris aterrima Kerremans, 1899^{c g}
- Chrysobothris atriplexae Fisher, 1942^{i c g}
- Chrysobothris auricincta Burmeister, 1872^{c g}
- Chrysobothris auricollis Kerremans, 1898^{c g}
- Chrysobothris auricornis Deyrolle, 1864^{c g}
- Chrysobothris aurifera Kirsch, 1866^{c g}
- Chrysobothris auripes Gory & Laporte, 1837^{c g}
- Chrysobothris auroimpressa Gory, 1841^{c g}
- Chrysobothris auropicta Kerremans, 1897^{c g}
- Chrysobothris auropunctata Deyrolle, 1864^{c g}
- Chrysobothris australasiae Hope, 1846^{c g}
- Chrysobothris axillaris Horn, 1886^{i c g}
- Chrysobothris azurea LeConte, 1857^{i c g b}
- Chrysobothris bacchari Van Dyke, 1923^{i c g b} (coyote bush buprestid)
- Chrysobothris badeni Théry, 1925^{c g}
- Chrysobothris ballae Whalley & Jarzembowski, 1985^{c g}
- Chrysobothris balzani Obenberger, 1922^{c g}
- Chrysobothris banghaasi Théry, 1911^{c g}
- Chrysobothris barellei Bourgoin, 1922^{c g}
- Chrysobothris barri Wescott, 1971^{i c g}
- Chrysobothris basalis LeConte, 1858^{i c g b}
- Chrysobothris beameri Knull, 1954^{i c g b}
- Chrysobothris beckeri Obenberger, 1956^{c g}
- Chrysobothris bedeli Obenberger, 1922^{c g}
- Chrysobothris behanzini Obenberger, 1940^{c g}
- Chrysobothris bekassana Obenberger, 1932^{c g}
- Chrysobothris bella Fisher, 1925^{c g}
- Chrysobothris bellata Thomson, 1879^{c g}
- Chrysobothris belti Waterhouse, 1887^{c g}
- Chrysobothris beniensis Fisher, 1925^{c g}
- Chrysobothris beyeri Schaeffer, 1904^{i c g b}
- Chrysobothris bicentra Obenberger, 1940^{c g}
- Chrysobothris bicolor Horn, 1894^{i c g}
- Chrysobothris bicolorata Bílý, 2000^{c g}
- Chrysobothris bicolorifrons Obenberger, 1940^{c g}
- Chrysobothris bicornis Gory & Laporte, 1837^{c g}
- Chrysobothris biimpressa (Chevrolat, 1838)^{c g}
- Chrysobothris bilyi Bellamy, 1998^{c g}
- Chrysobothris bimarginicollis Schaeffer, 1905^{i c g b}
- Chrysobothris bisinuata Chamberlin, 1938^{i c g}
- Chrysobothris bispinosa Schaeffer, 1909^{i c g b}
- Chrysobothris bistripunctata Deyrolle, 1864^{c g}
- Chrysobothris boharti Van Dyke, 1934^{i c g}
- Chrysobothris boliviae Obenberger, 1924^{c g}
- Chrysobothris boliviana Kerremans, 1897^{c g}
- Chrysobothris boninensis Kurosawa, 1975^{c g}
- Chrysobothris borneensis Kerremans, 1900^{c g}
- Chrysobothris bothrideres Fairmaire, 1864^{c g}
- Chrysobothris bouddah Théry, 1940^{c g}
- Chrysobothris brahma Obenberger, 1917^{c g}
- Chrysobothris braunsi Obenberger, 1922^{c g}
- Chrysobothris breviloba Fall, 1910^{i c g b}
- Chrysobothris breviloboides Barr, 1969^{i c g}
- Chrysobothris brevitarsis Nelson, 1975^{c g}
- Chrysobothris brixi Baudon, 1963^{c g}
- Chrysobothris bruchi Obenberger, 1928^{c g}
- Chrysobothris buenavistae Obenberger, 1928^{c g}
- Chrysobothris bumburetica Bílý, 2000^{c g}
- Chrysobothris buqueti Obenberger, 1922^{c g}
- Chrysobothris burgeoni Obenberger, 1924^{c g}
- Chrysobothris caddo Wellso & Manley, 2007^{i c g b}
- Chrysobothris caelata Carter, 1925^{c g}
- Chrysobothris californica LeConte, 1860^{i c g b}
- Chrysobothris callichroma Obenberger, 1939^{c g}
- Chrysobothris capensis Kerremans, 1893^{c g}
- Chrysobothris capitata Gory & Laporte, 1837^{c g}
- Chrysobothris carbonaria Gory & Laporte, 1837^{c g}
- Chrysobothris carbonicolor Obenberger, 1922^{c g}
- Chrysobothris carbunculifer Théry, 1911^{c g}
- Chrysobothris carinata Kerremans, 1892^{c g}
- Chrysobothris carinipennis LeConte, 1878^{i c g b}
- Chrysobothris carmelita Fall, 1907^{i c g}
- Chrysobothris carminea Kerremans, 1900^{c g}
- Chrysobothris carneola Saunders, 1870^{c g}
- Chrysobothris carteri Obenberger, 1923^{c g}
- Chrysobothris cashmirensis Obenberger, 1934^{c g}
- Chrysobothris catascopa Thomson, 1879^{c g}
- Chrysobothris catharinae Obenberger, 1940^{c g}
- Chrysobothris caurina Horn, 1886^{i c g b}
- Chrysobothris cavatifrons Obenberger, 1940^{c g}
- Chrysobothris cavifrons Deyrolle, 1864^{c g}
- Chrysobothris chactas Gory & Laporte, 1837^{c g}
- Chrysobothris chalcophana (Klug, 1829)^{c g}
- Chrysobothris chalcophoroides Horn, 1886^{i c g b} (sculptured oak borer)
- Chrysobothris chalybea Gory & Laporte, 1837^{c g}
- Chrysobothris chamberliniana Fisher, 1948^{i c g}
- Chrysobothris cheni Théry, 1940^{c g}
- Chrysobothris chiribiquetensis Bellamy, 1995^{c g}
- Chrysobothris chiricahuae Knull, 1937^{i c g}
- Chrysobothris chiriquita Obenberger^{g}
- Chrysobothris chlorocephala Gory, 1841^{i c g b}
- Chrysobothris chlorosticta Thomson, 1878^{c g}
- Chrysobothris chrysoela (Illiger, 1800)^{i c g b}
- Chrysobothris chrysogaster Bourgoin, 1922^{c g}
- Chrysobothris chrysonota Deyrolle, 1864^{c g}
- Chrysobothris chrysostigma (Linnaeus, 1758)^{c g}
- Chrysobothris chuckbellamyi Westcott, 2014^{g}
- Chrysobothris cincta Kerremans, 1893^{c g}
- Chrysobothris circe Obenberger, 1940^{c g}
- Chrysobothris circuloimpressa Deyrolle, 1864^{c g}
- Chrysobothris coelicolor Obenberger, 1922^{c g}
- Chrysobothris coeruleoglabrata Obenberger, 1917^{c g}
- Chrysobothris collaris Deyrolle, 1864^{c g}
- Chrysobothris coloradensis Wickham, 1914^{c g}
- Chrysobothris comanche Wellso & Manley, 2007^{i c g b}
- Chrysobothris confusa Deyrolle, 1864^{c g}
- Chrysobothris congeneratrix Obenberger, 1934^{c g}
- Chrysobothris consanguinea (Gory & Laporte, 1837)
- Chrysobothris consimilis (Gory, 1841)^{c g}
- Chrysobothris convexa Fall, 1907^{i c g}
- Chrysobothris convexiuscula Waterhouse, 1887^{c g}
- Chrysobothris cordicollis Gory & Laporte, 1837^{c g}
- Chrysobothris cordillerae Obenberger, 1928^{c g}
- Chrysobothris cordovensis Gory & Laporte, 1837^{c g}
- Chrysobothris cornifrons Obenberger, 1940^{c g}
- Chrysobothris cornigera Fisher, 1944^{c g}
- Chrysobothris cornuta Kerremans, 1903^{c g}
- Chrysobothris corporaali Obenberger, 1922
- Chrysobothris costaricana Obenberger, 1917^{c g}
- Chrysobothris costata Kerremans, 1895^{c g}
- Chrysobothris costifer Kerremans, 1909^{c g}
- Chrysobothris costifrons Waterhouse, 1887^{i c g b}
- Chrysobothris crandalli Knull, 1943^{i c g b}
- Chrysobothris crenulipyga Obenberger, 1924^{c g}
- Chrysobothris cribifrons Thomson, 1879^{g}
- Chrysobothris cribraria Mannerheim, 1837^{i c g b}
- Chrysobothris cribrifrons Thomson, 1879^{c g}
- Chrysobothris cubensis Théry, 1927^{c g}
- Chrysobothris culbersoniana Knull, 1943^{i c g}
- Chrysobothris cunctans Obenberger, 1924^{c g}
- Chrysobothris cuprascens LeConte, 1860^{i c g b}
- Chrysobothris cupreipes Fairmaire, 1864^{c g}
- Chrysobothris cupreomactata Obenberger, 1928^{c g}
- Chrysobothris cupressicona Barr & Westcott, 1976^{i c g b} (flatheaded cypress cone borer)
- Chrysobothris cupriceps Deyrolle, 1864^{c g}
- Chrysobothris cupricollis Deyrolle, 1864^{c g}
- Chrysobothris cuprifrons Fisher, 1925^{c g}
- Chrysobothris cuprina (Klug, 1829)^{c g}
- Chrysobothris cupriventris Thomson, 1878^{c g}
- Chrysobothris curlettii Magnani, 1995^{c g}
- Chrysobothris curta Kerremans, 1893^{c g}
- Chrysobothris curvicollis Kerremans, 1900^{c g}
- Chrysobothris cyanella Horn, 1886^{i c g b}
- Chrysobothris cyanescens Deyrolle, 1864^{c g}
- Chrysobothris cyanicollis Gory & Laporte, 1837^{c g}
- Chrysobothris cyanipennis Deyrolle, 1864^{c g}
- Chrysobothris cypria Magnani, 1993^{c g}
- Chrysobothris danae Obenberger, 1940^{c g}
- Chrysobothris debilis LeConte, 1860^{i c g}
- Chrysobothris decolorata (Gory & Laporte, 1837)^{c g}
- Chrysobothris deflexicornis Gory & Laporte, 1837^{c g}
- Chrysobothris delavayi Fairmaire, 1887^{c g}
- Chrysobothris delectabilis Waterhouse, 1889^{c g}
- Chrysobothris delenifica Deyrolle, 1864
- Chrysobothris deliana Kerremans, 1900^{c g}
- Chrysobothris densa Waterhouse, 1889^{c g}
- Chrysobothris densepunctata Obenberger, 1940^{c g}
- Chrysobothris dentipes (Germar, 1824)^{i c g b}
- Chrysobothris deserta Horn, 1886^{i c g b}
- Chrysobothris desmaresti (Laporte & Gory, 1836)^{c g}
- Chrysobothris deuvei Baudon, 1963^{c g}
- Chrysobothris deyrollei Thomson, 1858^{c g}
- Chrysobothris dilaticollis Kerremans, 1897^{c g}
- Chrysobothris discedens Gemminger & Harold, 1869^{c g}
- Chrysobothris discicollis Saunders, 1867^{c g}
- Chrysobothris disparicollis Thomson, 1879^{c g}
- Chrysobothris distincta Gory, 1841^{i c g}
- Chrysobothris dolata Horn, 1886^{i c g b}
- Chrysobothris dorbignyi (Gory, 1841)^{c g}
- Chrysobothris dorsata (Fabricius, 1787)^{c g}
- Chrysobothris dubiosula Obenberger, 1928^{c g}
- Chrysobothris dudichi Gebhardt, 1926^{c g}
- Chrysobothris dudleyaphaga Wescott, 2007^{i c g}
- Chrysobothris dugesi Kerremans, 1897^{c g}
- Chrysobothris duplicata (Chevrolat, 1838)^{c g}
- Chrysobothris duporti Bourgoin, 1922^{c g}
- Chrysobothris dyopatra Gory, 1841^{c g}
- Chrysobothris dyoti Théry, 1925^{c g}
- Chrysobothris ebenina Théry, 1925^{c g}
- Chrysobothris ecuadorica Obenberger, 1928^{c g}
- Chrysobothris edwardsii Horn, 1886^{i c g b}
- Chrysobothris elevata Gory & Laporte, 1837^{c g}
- Chrysobothris ellyptica Deyrolle, 1864^{c g}
- Chrysobothris elongata Deyrolle, 1864^{c g}
- Chrysobothris emarginaticollis Blanchard, 1846^{c g}
- Chrysobothris embriki Obenberger, 1932^{c g}
- Chrysobothris empyrea Gerstäcker, 1871^{c g}
- Chrysobothris eos Obenberger, 1924^{c g}
- Chrysobothris ephedrae Knull, 1942^{i c g b}
- Chrysobothris eriogoni Wescott, 2005^{i c g b}
- Chrysobothris errans Gory, 1841^{c g}
- Chrysobothris erudita Hoscheck, 1931^{c g}
- Chrysobothris erythraeina Obenberger, 1940^{c g}
- Chrysobothris erythrogona (Kirsch, 1866)^{c g}
- Chrysobothris eurycephala Obenberger, 1934^{c g}
- Chrysobothris exesa LeConte, 1858^{i c g b}
- Chrysobothris explicationis Nelson, 1975^{c g}
- Chrysobothris fabricii Saunders, 1871^{c g}
- Chrysobothris fabulosa Nelson, 1988^{c g}
- Chrysobothris facialis Hoscheck, 1931^{c g}
- Chrysobothris falli Van Dyke, 1918^{i c g}
- Chrysobothris fastidiosa Gory, 1841^{c g}
- Chrysobothris fatalis Harold, 1878^{c g}
- Chrysobothris felixi Gebhardt, 1926^{c g}
- Chrysobothris femorata (Olivier, 1790)^{i c g b} (flatheaded appletree borer)
- Chrysobothris fiji Bellamy, 2009^{c g}
- Chrysobothris fisheri Théry, 1927^{c g}
- Chrysobothris fisheriana Obenberger, 1928^{c g}
- Chrysobothris fiskei Fisher, 1942^{i c g b}
- Chrysobothris fluvialis Moore, 1986^{c g}
- Chrysobothris fossifrons Kerremans, 1892^{c g}
- Chrysobothris foveata Waterhouse, 1887^{c g}
- Chrysobothris foveiceps Saunders, 1867^{c g}
- Chrysobothris foveicollis Kerremans, 1893^{c g}
- Chrysobothris fragariae Fisher, 1930^{i c g}
- Chrysobothris francoisi Baudon, 1966^{c g}
- Chrysobothris fraudi Théry, 1931^{c g}
- Chrysobothris freyi (Pochon, 1972)^{c g}
- Chrysobothris frontalis (Olivier, 1790)^{c g}
- Chrysobothris fronticornis (Chevrolat, 1838)^{c g}
- Chrysobothris frontiscalla Domínguez & Márquez, 1971^{c g}
- Chrysobothris fruta Gory, 1841^{c g}
- Chrysobothris funeraria Obenberger, 1922^{c g}
- Chrysobothris furcata Kerremans, 1913^{c g}
- Chrysobothris gahani Cockerell, 1911^{c g}
- Chrysobothris gardneri Théry, 1930^{c g}
- Chrysobothris gardnerianus Descarpentries, 1959^{c g}
- Chrysobothris gebhardti Théry, 1936^{c g}
- Chrysobothris gebieni Kerremans, 1914^{c g}
- Chrysobothris gedyei Théry, 1941^{c g}
- Chrysobothris gelhardtiana Théry, 1941^{c g}
- Chrysobothris gemmata LeConte, 1858^{i c g b}
- Chrysobothris generosa Gory & Laporte, 1837^{c g}
- Chrysobothris gentilis Kerremans, 1897^{c g}
- Chrysobothris georgei Nelson, 1980^{c g}
- Chrysobothris gerstmeier Barries, 2010^{c g}
- Chrysobothris ghesquierei Théry, 1940^{c g}
- Chrysobothris gloriosa Fisher, 1922^{c g}
- Chrysobothris gounellei Kerremans, 1897^{c g}
- Chrysobothris gowdeyi Fisher, 1928^{c g}
- Chrysobothris grancanariae Niehuis & Gottwald, 1999^{c g}
- Chrysobothris gratiosa Gory, 1841^{c g}
- Chrysobothris graueri Kerremans, 1914^{c g}
- Chrysobothris gravenhorsti Obenberger, 1922^{c g}
- Chrysobothris grindeliae Van Dyke, 1937^{i c g}
- Chrysobothris guadeloupensis Descarpentries, 1981^{g}
- Chrysobothris guatemalensis Thomson, 1878^{c g}
- Chrysobothris guineensis Obenberger, 1940^{c g}
- Chrysobothris guttata (Olivier, 1790)^{c g}
- Chrysobothris guyanensis Thomson, 1879^{c g}
- Chrysobothris haitiensis Fisher, 1930^{c g}
- Chrysobothris handschini Obenberger, 1940^{c g}
- Chrysobothris harrisi (Hentz, 1827)^{i b}
- Chrysobothris hauseri Obenberger, 1928^{c g}
- Chrysobothris haydeni Scudder, 1876^{c g}
- Chrysobothris helferi Fisher, 1942^{i c g}
- Chrysobothris hera Obenberger, 1924^{c g}
- Chrysobothris hexastigma Mannerheim, 1837^{c g}
- Chrysobothris heyrovskyi Obenberger, 1922^{c g}
- Chrysobothris hidalgoensis Knull, 1951^{i c g}
- Chrysobothris hispaniolae Fisher, 1925^{c g}
- Chrysobothris hobsoni Baudon, 1963^{c g}
- Chrysobothris holochalcea Burmeister, 1872^{c g}
- Chrysobothris holynskii Barries, 2011^{c g}
- Chrysobothris horaki Barries, 2008^{c g}
- Chrysobothris horni Kerremans, 1903^{c g}
- Chrysobothris horningi Barr, 1969^{i c g}
- Chrysobothris horvathi Gebhardt, 1926^{c g}
- Chrysobothris hoscheki Théry, 1925^{c g}
- Chrysobothris hubbardi Fisher, 1942^{i c g b}
- Chrysobothris humilis Horn, 1886^{i c g b}
- Chrysobothris hypochloris Erichson, 1847^{c g}
- Chrysobothris ianthinipes Obenberger, 1928^{c g}
- Chrysobothris ichthyomorpha Thomson, 1879^{c g}
- Chrysobothris idahoensis Barr, 1969^{i c g}
- Chrysobothris igai Kurosawa, 1948^{c g}
- Chrysobothris ignicollis Horn, 1885^{i c g b}
- Chrysobothris ignipicta Kerremans, 1900
- Chrysobothris ignisternum Obenberger, 1924^{c g}
- Chrysobothris igniventris Reitter, 1895^{c g}
- Chrysobothris ignota Dugès, 1891^{c g}
- Chrysobothris inaequalicollis Thomson, 1878^{c g}
- Chrysobothris inaequalis Waterhouse, 1887^{c g}
- Chrysobothris indica Castelnau and Gory, 1837^{i c g}
- Chrysobothris indigacea Kerremans, 1893^{c g}
- Chrysobothris infantula Obenberger, 1940^{c g}
- Chrysobothris infima Kerremans, 1893^{c g}
- Chrysobothris infranitens Kerremans, 1912^{c g}
- Chrysobothris insidiosa Waterhouse, 1887^{c g}
- Chrysobothris insolata Deyrolle, 1864^{c g}
- Chrysobothris insulana Fisher, 1925^{c g}
- Chrysobothris iridea Kerremans, 1900^{c g}
- Chrysobothris iris Van Dyke, 1937^{i c g}
- Chrysobothris jakovlevi Semenov, 1891^{c g}
- Chrysobothris jania Lotte, 1938^{c g}
- Chrysobothris janthina (Gory, 1841)^{c g}
- Chrysobothris javae Obenberger, 1932^{c g}
- Chrysobothris javana Thomson, 1879^{c g}
- Chrysobothris jeanneli Obenberger, 1928^{c g}
- Chrysobothris jendeki Barries, 2006^{c g}
- Chrysobothris joellae Bleuzen, 1993^{c g}
- Chrysobothris juncta Waterhouse, 1887^{c g}
- Chrysobothris kabakovi Alexeev in Alexeev, et al., 1991^{c g}
- Chrysobothris kalaharica Obenberger, 1940^{c g}
- Chrysobothris kalshoveni Obenberger, 1931
- Chrysobothris kelloggi Knull, 1937^{i c g}
- Chrysobothris keyensis Gestro, 1877^{c g}
- Chrysobothris kiangsuanus Théry, 1940^{c g}
- Chrysobothris knulli Nelson, 1975^{i c g b} (Knull's chrysobothris)
- Chrysobothris komareki Obenberger, 1928^{c g}
- Chrysobothris kordofana Obenberger, 1928^{c g}
- Chrysobothris kotoensis Miwa & Chûjô, 1940^{c g}
- Chrysobothris kraatzi Kerremans, 1899^{c g}
- Chrysobothris kucerai Barries, 2008^{c g}
- Chrysobothris kuntzeni Hoscheck, 1931^{c g}
- Chrysobothris labaili Baudon, 1968^{c g}
- Chrysobothris lancii Gory & Laporte, 1837^{c g}
- Chrysobothris lanei Théry, 1936^{c g}
- Chrysobothris laosensis Obenberger, 1928
- Chrysobothris laricis Van Dyke, 1916^{i c g}
- Chrysobothris lateralis Waterhouse, 1887^{i c g b}
- Chrysobothris laticollis Burmeister, 1872^{c g}
- Chrysobothris latifrons Deyrolle, 1864^{c g}
- Chrysobothris lativertex Obenberger, 1940^{c g}
- Chrysobothris laudabilis Théry, 1936^{c g}
- Chrysobothris leechi Barr, 1974^{i c g b}
- Chrysobothris legorskyi Barries, 2012^{c g}
- Chrysobothris leonhardi Obenberger, 1916^{c g}
- Chrysobothris lepida Gory & Laporte, 1837^{c g}
- Chrysobothris lesnei Théry, 1934^{c g}
- Chrysobothris lesueuri Gory & Laporte, 1837^{c g}
- Chrysobothris leuconoe Obenberger, 1940^{c g}
- Chrysobothris libanonica Obenberger, 1935^{c g}
- Chrysobothris libonoti Horn, 1886^{i c g b}
- Chrysobothris lilaceous Chamberlin, 1925^{i c g}
- Chrysobothris lineatipennis Van Dyke, 1916^{i c g}
- Chrysobothris linnei Obenberger, 1922^{c g}
- Chrysobothris lixa Horn, 1886^{i c g b}
- Chrysobothris lobata Kerremans, 1897^{c g}
- Chrysobothris longula Saunders, 1867^{c g}
- Chrysobothris lucana Horn, 1894^{i c g b}
- Chrysobothris lucifera Théry, 1911^{c g}
- Chrysobothris ludificata Horn, 1886^{i c g b}
- Chrysobothris macarthuri Théry, 1941^{c g}
- Chrysobothris macleayi Obenberger, 1928^{c g}
- Chrysobothris maculata Gory & Laporte, 1837^{c g}
- Chrysobothris maculicollis Thomson, 1878^{c g}
- Chrysobothris maculicoxis Obenberger, 1940^{c g}
- Chrysobothris maculiventris (Chevrolat, 1838)^{c g}
- Chrysobothris maillei Gory & Laporte, 1837^{c g}
- Chrysobothris malayensis Fisher, 1930^{c g}
- Chrysobothris mali Horn, 1886^{i c g b} (Pacific flatheaded borer)
- Chrysobothris manchurica Arakawa, 1932^{c g}
- Chrysobothris mandarina Théry, 1940^{c g}
- Chrysobothris manifesta Obenberger, 1940^{c g}
- Chrysobothris maracaensis Théry, 1925^{c g}
- Chrysobothris marina Abeille de Perrin, 1907^{c g}
- Chrysobothris marquesana Obenberger, 1928^{c g}
- Chrysobothris martha Van Dyke, 1942^{c g}
- Chrysobothris mastersii Macleay, 1872^{c g}
- Chrysobothris matangana Kerremans, 1912^{c g}
- Chrysobothris megacephala Gory & Laporte, 1837^{c g}
- Chrysobothris melazona Chevrolat, 1835^{c g}
- Chrysobothris merkelii Horn, 1886^{i c g b} (merkel buprestid)
- Chrysobothris mescalero Wellso & Manley, 2007^{i c g b}
- Chrysobothris michelbacheri Van Dyke, 1942^{c g}
- Chrysobothris micromorpha Fall, 1907^{i c g}
- Chrysobothris microstigma Gestro, 1877^{c g}
- Chrysobothris militaris Deyrolle, 1864^{c g}
- Chrysobothris minuta Kerremans, 1896^{c g}
- Chrysobothris miraculosa Obenberger, 1928^{c g}
- Chrysobothris modesta Waterhouse, 1887^{c g}
- Chrysobothris mokrzeckii Obenberger, 1928^{c g}
- Chrysobothris moluccana Hoscheck, 1931^{c g}
- Chrysobothris montezuma Obenberger, 1940^{c g}
- Chrysobothris monticola Fall, 1910^{i c g b}
- Chrysobothris montrouzieri Kerremans, 1892^{c g}
- Chrysobothris mrazi Obenberger, 1924^{c g}
- Chrysobothris muehlei Barries, 2008^{c g}
- Chrysobothris mulsanti Obenberger, 1922^{c g}
- Chrysobothris multistigmosa (Mannerheim, 1837)^{c g}
- Chrysobothris musae Théry, 1904^{c g}
- Chrysobothris myia Gory, 1841^{c g}
- Chrysobothris myoptica Obenberger, 1940^{c g}
- Chrysobothris nana Fairmaire, 1892^{c g}
- Chrysobothris natalensis Théry, 1925^{c g}
- Chrysobothris nausicaa Thomson, 1879^{c g}
- Chrysobothris nelsoni Westcott & Alten, 2006^{i c g b}
- Chrysobothris neopusilla Fisher, 1942^{i c g b}
- Chrysobothris neotexana Dozier, 1955^{i c g b}
- Chrysobothris nicaraguensis Obenberger, 1928^{c g}
- Chrysobothris nickerli Obenberger, 1922^{c g}
- Chrysobothris nigripennis Deyrolle, 1864^{c g}
- Chrysobothris nigrita Kerremans, 1893^{c g}
- Chrysobothris nigriventris Théry, 1928^{c g}
- Chrysobothris nigropicta Nelson, 1988^{c g}
- Chrysobothris nigroviolacea Deyrolle, 1864^{c g}
- Chrysobothris nisatoi Barries, 2011^{c g}
- Chrysobothris niveifrons Obenberger, 1928^{c g}
- Chrysobothris nixa Horn, 1886^{i c g b} (flatheaded cedar borer)
- Chrysobothris nobilis (Fabricius, 1787)^{c g}
- Chrysobothris nodipennis Kerremans, 1899^{c g}
- Chrysobothris obenbergeri Gebhardt, 1926^{c g}
- Chrysobothris occidentis Obenberger, 1922^{c g}
- Chrysobothris occipitalis Deyrolle, 1864^{c g}
- Chrysobothris octocola LeConte, 1858^{i c g b}
- Chrysobothris octofoveolata Thomson, 1879^{c g}
- Chrysobothris octomaculata Carter, 1925^{c g}
- Chrysobothris octonotata Saunders, 1874^{c g}
- Chrysobothris ohbayashii Kurosawa, 1948^{c g}
- Chrysobothris ohnoi Kurosawa, 1975^{c g}
- Chrysobothris okorosawana Obenberger, 1940^{c g}
- Chrysobothris omurai Baudon, 1968^{c g}
- Chrysobothris oregona Chamberlin, 1934^{i c g}
- Chrysobothris orono Frost, 1920^{i c g b}
- Chrysobothris orothi Baudon, 1963^{c g}
- Chrysobothris ovalis Kerremans, 1903^{c g}
- Chrysobothris palaui Cobos, 1954^{c g}
- Chrysobothris palawanensis Barries, 2006^{c g}
- Chrysobothris pampas Thomson, 1879^{c g}
- Chrysobothris pantochlora Guérin-Méneville, 1847^{c g}
- Chrysobothris paragrindeliae Knull, 1943^{i c g}
- Chrysobothris paraguayensis Obenberger, 1917^{c g}
- Chrysobothris parallela Deyrolle, 1864^{c g}
- Chrysobothris paramodesta Nelson, 1975^{c g}
- Chrysobothris parapiuta Knull, 1938^{i c g}
- Chrysobothris paratabalipa Nelson, 1975^{c g}
- Chrysobothris pardensis Kerremans, 1903^{c g}
- Chrysobothris parvipunctata Obenberger, 1914^{c g}
- Chrysobothris parvofoveata Fisher, 1925^{c g}
- Chrysobothris paulensis Théry, 1936^{c g}
- Chrysobothris pedroi Obenberger, 1940^{c g}
- Chrysobothris peninsularis Schaeffer, 1904^{i c g b}
- Chrysobothris peringueyi Théry, 1925^{c g}
- Chrysobothris perplexa Deyrolle, 1864^{c g}
- Chrysobothris perroni Gory & Laporte, 1837^{c g}
- Chrysobothris peruviae Obenberger, 1924^{c g}
- Chrysobothris petersoni Hawkeswood, 1997^{c g}
- Chrysobothris philippinensis Saunders, 1874^{c g}
- Chrysobothris phoebe Thomson, 1878^{c g}
- Chrysobothris picipes Kerremans, 1893^{c g}
- Chrysobothris picklesi Théry, 1938^{c g}
- Chrysobothris pictiventris Saunders, 1874^{c g}
- Chrysobothris pilifrons Kerremans, 1893^{c g}
- Chrysobothris piuta Wickham, 1903^{i c g b}
- Chrysobothris placida Kerremans, 1897^{c g}
- Chrysobothris pluton Gory, 1841^{c g}
- Chrysobothris polita Kerremans, 1897^{c g}
- Chrysobothris polychrous Bílý, 1983^{c g}
- Chrysobothris polymetallichroma Westcott, 1998^{c g}
- Chrysobothris polyspilota Burmeister, 1872^{c g}
- Chrysobothris potentillae Barr, 1969^{i c g}
- Chrysobothris prasina Horn, 1886^{i c g b}
- Chrysobothris prava Obenberger, 1924^{c g}
- Chrysobothris preissi Obenberger, 1922^{c g}
- Chrysobothris pressli Obenberger, 1922^{c g}
- Chrysobothris pseudacutipennis Obenberger, 1940^{i c g b}
- Chrysobothris pseudinsularis Hoscheck, 1931^{c g}
- Chrysobothris pseudotsugae Van Dyke, 1916^{i c g b}
- Chrysobothris pubilineata Vogt, 1949^{i c g b}
- Chrysobothris puella Gory, 1841^{c g}
- Chrysobothris pulchella Gory & Laporte, 1837^{c g}
- Chrysobothris pulcherrima Snellen von Vollenhoven, 1864^{c g}
- Chrysobothris pulchra Gory & Laporte, 1837^{c g}
- Chrysobothris pulchripes Fairmaire, 1887^{c g}
- Chrysobothris pumpuna Blackwelder, 1944^{c g}
- Chrysobothris puncticollis Kerremans, 1897^{c g}
- Chrysobothris punctiventris Kerremans, 1897^{c g}
- Chrysobothris purpurata Bland, 1864^{i c g}
- Chrysobothris purpureicollis Kerremans, 1900
- Chrysobothris purpureoplagiata Schaeffer, 1904^{i c g b}
- Chrysobothris purpureovittata Horn, 1886^{i c g b}
- Chrysobothris purpurescens Kerremans, 1907^{c g}
- Chrysobothris purpurifrons Motschulsky, 1859^{i c g}
- Chrysobothris pusilla Gory & Laporte, 1837^{i c g b}
- Chrysobothris pygmaea Kerremans, 1897^{c g}
- Chrysobothris quadraticollis Kerremans, 1892^{c g}
- Chrysobothris quadriimpressa Gory & Laporte, 1837^{c g b}
- Chrysobothris quadrilineata LeConte, 1860^{i c g b}
- Chrysobothris quadrimaculata (Fabricius, 1776)^{c g}
- Chrysobothris quadriplagiata Waterhouse, 1887^{c g}
- Chrysobothris queenslandica Hawkeswood, 1986^{c g}
- Chrysobothris ras Obenberger, 1940^{c g}
- Chrysobothris ravilla Obenberger, 1924^{c g}
- Chrysobothris regina Kerremans, 1898^{c g}
- Chrysobothris regradata Wallengren, 1881^{c g}
- Chrysobothris rejzeki Niehuis, 2009^{c g}
- Chrysobothris richteri Obenberger, 1928^{c g}
- Chrysobothris riedlei Barries, 2008^{c g}
- Chrysobothris riograndina Obenberger, 1940^{c g}
- Chrysobothris ritsemae Gestro, 1877^{c g}
- Chrysobothris rogaguaensis Fisher, 1925^{c g}
- Chrysobothris roguensis Beer, 1967^{i c g}
- Chrysobothris romeroi Westcott, 2014^{g}
- Chrysobothris rondoni Baudon, 1963^{c g}
- Chrysobothris roseiventris Thomson, 1878^{c g}
- Chrysobothris rossi Van Dyke, 1942^{i c g b}
- Chrysobothris rothkirchi Obenberger, 1922^{c g}
- Chrysobothris rotundicollis Gory & Laporte, 1837^{i c g b}
- Chrysobothris rubimaculata (Gory & Laporte, 1837)^{c g}
- Chrysobothris rubripes Chevrolat, 1838^{c g}
- Chrysobothris rudipennis Kerremans, 1903^{c g}
- Chrysobothris rugifrons Kerremans, 1893^{c g}
- Chrysobothris rugipes Gory & Laporte, 1837^{c g}
- Chrysobothris rugosa Gory & Laporte, 1837^{c g}
- Chrysobothris rugosiceps Melsheimer, 1845^{i c g b}
- Chrysobothris rugosipennis Théry, 1947^{c g}
- Chrysobothris rutilans Kerremans, 1897^{c g}
- Chrysobothris rutilicuspis Heller, 1893^{c g}
- Chrysobothris sacrata Obenberger, 1924^{c g}
- Chrysobothris sadahiroi Barries, 2011^{c g}
- Chrysobothris salebrosa Kerremans, 1893^{c g}
- Chrysobothris saliaris Kurosawa, 1948^{c g}
- Chrysobothris sallaei Waterhouse, 1887^{c g}
- Chrysobothris salomonica Obenberger, 1922^{c g}
- Chrysobothris samai Curletti & Magnani, 1988^{c g}
- Chrysobothris samurai Obenberger, 1935^{c g}
- Chrysobothris sapphirina (Swartz, 1817)^{c g}
- Chrysobothris saundersii Macleay, 1872^{c g}
- Chrysobothris sauteri Kerremans, 1912^{c g}
- Chrysobothris scabripennis Gory & Laporte, 1837^{i c g b}
- Chrysobothris schaefferi Obenberger, 1934^{i c g}
- Chrysobothris schistomorion Westcott and Davidson, 2001^{i c g}
- Chrysobothris schlueteri Théry, 1925^{c g}
- Chrysobothris schoutedeni Obenberger, 1921^{c g}
- Chrysobothris scintillatrix Obenberger, 1940^{c g}
- Chrysobothris scitula Gory, 1841^{i c g b}
- Chrysobothris seminole Wellso & Manley, 2007^{i c g b}
- Chrysobothris semisculpta LeConte, 1860^{i c g b}
- Chrysobothris semisuturalis (Kerremans, 1899)^{c g}
- Chrysobothris sericeifrons Théry, 1898^{c g}
- Chrysobothris serripes Schaeffer, 1905^{i c g}
- Chrysobothris sexangula Kerremans, 1897^{c g}
- Chrysobothris sexfasciata Schaeffer, 1919^{i c g b}
- Chrysobothris seximpressa Mannerheim, 1837^{c g}
- Chrysobothris sexnotata Gory, 1841^{c g}
- Chrysobothris sexpunctata (Fabricius, 1801)^{c g}
- Chrysobothris sexsignata Say, 1839^{i c g b}
- Chrysobothris sexstigmata Gory & Laporte, 1837^{c g}
- Chrysobothris shawnee Wellso & Manley, 2007^{i c g b}
- Chrysobothris shinanensis Kano, 1929^{c g}
- Chrysobothris shirakii Miwa & Chûjô, 1935^{c g}
- Chrysobothris shiwakii Miwa & Chujo, 1935^{g}
- Chrysobothris shortlandica Obenberger, 1928^{c g}
- Chrysobothris siamensis Hoscheck, 1931^{c g}
- Chrysobothris sibuyana Fisher, 1924^{c g}
- Chrysobothris similis Saunders, 1867^{c g}
- Chrysobothris simillima Obenberger, 1940^{c g}
- Chrysobothris simplex Waterhouse, 1887^{c g}
- Chrysobothris simplicifrons Kerremans, 1903^{c g}
- Chrysobothris sinensis Fairmaire, 1887^{c g}
- Chrysobothris singalesa Obenberger, 1922^{c g}
- Chrysobothris skalei Barries, 2010^{c g}
- Chrysobothris sloicola Manley & Wellso, 1976^{i c g b}
- Chrysobothris smaltzi Théry, 1911^{c g}
- Chrysobothris smaragdinea Kerremans, 1893^{c g}
- Chrysobothris smaragdula Fall, 1907^{i c g}
- Chrysobothris sobrina Dugès, 1891^{c g}
- Chrysobothris socialis Waterhouse, 1887^{i c g}
- Chrysobothris solieri Gory & Laporte, 1837^{c g}
- Chrysobothris somereni Théry, 1931^{c g}
- Chrysobothris soror Gory & Laporte, 1837^{c g}
- Chrysobothris speculifer Horn, 1886^{i c g b}
- Chrysobothris spinicollis Théry, 1911^{c g}
- Chrysobothris standa Barries, 2011^{c g}
- Chrysobothris staudingeri Kerremans, 1897^{c g}
- Chrysobothris steinbachi Obenberger, 1928^{c g}
- Chrysobothris stellifera Waterhouse, 1887^{c g}
- Chrysobothris stephensi Gory & Laporte, 1837^{c g}
- Chrysobothris sterbai Obenberger, 1932^{c g}
- Chrysobothris storkani Obenberger, 1940^{c g}
- Chrysobothris strandiana Obenberger, 1922^{c g}
- Chrysobothris stricklandi Obenberger, 1924^{c g}
- Chrysobothris strigicollis Théry, 1898^{c g}
- Chrysobothris subcylindrica Ménétries in Motschulsky, 1859^{i c g b}
- Chrysobothris subopaca Schaeffer, 1904^{i c g}
- Chrysobothris subrugosa Kerremans, 1903^{c g}
- Chrysobothris subsimilis Thomson, 1879^{c g}
- Chrysobothris succedanea Saunders, 1873^{c g}
- Chrysobothris sudanensis Obenberger, 1940^{c g}
- Chrysobothris sulci Obenberger, 1932^{c g}
- Chrysobothris sumbana Obenberger, 1932^{c g}
- Chrysobothris superba Deyrolle, 1864^{c g}
- Chrysobothris suppressa Wickham, 1914^{c g}
- Chrysobothris suturalis Walker, 1858^{c g}
- Chrysobothris sylvania Fall, 1910^{i c g}
- Chrysobothris taciturna Kerremans, 1897^{c g}
- Chrysobothris takahashii Barries, 2009^{c g}
- Chrysobothris tenebricosa Kerremans, 1897^{c g}
- Chrysobothris tessellata Westcott *in* Westcott, *et al*., 2008^{c g}
- Chrysobothris texana LeConte, 1860^{i c g b}
- Chrysobothris texcocana Domínguez, 1969^{c g}
- Chrysobothris thomae Kerremans, 1899^{c g}
- Chrysobothris thomsoni Waterhouse, 1887^{c g}
- Chrysobothris thoracica (Fabricius, 1798)^{c g}
- Chrysobothris tibidens Domínguez & Márquez, 1971^{c g}
- Chrysobothris timida Kerremans, 1897^{c g}
- Chrysobothris tonkinensis Bourgoin, 1922^{c g}
- Chrysobothris totonaca Domínguez & Márquez, 1971^{c g}
- Chrysobothris tranquebarica (Gmelin, 1788)^{i c g b} (Australian pine borer)
- Chrysobothris transvalensis Obenberger, 1940^{c g}
- Chrysobothris tricolor Kerremans, 1892^{c g}
- Chrysobothris trinervia Kirby, 1837^{i c g b}
- Chrysobothris trisignata Waterhouse, 1887^{c g}
- Chrysobothris tristis Deyrolle, 1864^{c g}
- Chrysobothris trochantispina Domínguez & Márquez, 1971^{c g}
- Chrysobothris trochilus Waterhouse, 1887^{c g}
- Chrysobothris tumida Chevrolat, 1867^{c g}
- Chrysobothris umbrosa Kerremans, 1903^{c g}
- Chrysobothris umrongsoi Barries, 2007^{c g}
- Chrysobothris unica Deyrolle, 1864^{c g}
- Chrysobothris unigemmata Obenberger, 1922^{c g}
- Chrysobothris uruguayensis Obenberger, 1932^{c g}
- Chrysobothris ventralis Saunders, 1874^{i c g}
- Chrysobothris ventriplaga Obenberger, 1928^{c g}
- Chrysobothris venustula Gory & Laporte, 1837^{c g}
- Chrysobothris verdigripennis Frost, 1910^{i c g b}
- Chrysobothris verityi Nelson, 1975^{c g}
- Chrysobothris veselyi Obenberger, 1922^{c g}
- Chrysobothris vicina Kerremans, 1900^{c g}
- Chrysobothris vidua Fisher, 1930^{c g}
- Chrysobothris vilucana Obenberger, 1928^{c g}
- Chrysobothris violacea Kerremans, 1892^{c g}
- Chrysobothris violaceotincta Obenberger, 1922^{c g}
- Chrysobothris viridiceps Melsheimer, 1845^{i c g b}
- Chrysobothris viridicyanea Horn, 1886^{i c g b}
- Chrysobothris viridifasciata (Gory & Laporte, 1838)^{c g}
- Chrysobothris viridiimpressa Gory & Laporte, 1837^{c g}
- Chrysobothris viridilabrata Obenberger, 1928^{c g}
- Chrysobothris viridinotata (Gory & Laporte, 1838)^{c g}
- Chrysobothris viridis Macleay, 1872^{c g}
- Chrysobothris vitalisi Bourgoin, 1922^{c g}
- Chrysobothris vivida Knull, 1952^{i c g}
- Chrysobothris vulcanica LeConte, 1861^{i c g b}
- Chrysobothris vulgata Obenberger, 1928^{c g}
- Chrysobothris wagneri Kerremans, 1913^{c g}
- Chrysobothris wallacei Saunders, 1871^{c g}
- Chrysobothris waynei Bellamy, 1998^{c g}
- Chrysobothris weigeli Barries, 2011^{c g}
- Chrysobothris westcotti Barr, 1969^{i c g b} (Westcott's flathead)
- Chrysobothris weyersi Kerremans, 1900^{c g}
- Chrysobothris wickhami Fisher, 1942^{i c g}
- Chrysobothris widdringtoniae Descarpentries, 1959^{c g}
- Chrysobothris wilkinsoni Théry, 1947^{c g}
- Chrysobothris williamsi Van Dyke, 1953^{c g}
- Chrysobothris wintu Wellso & Manley, 2007^{i c g b}
- Chrysobothris wolcotti Fisher, 1925^{c g}
- Chrysobothris woodgatei Champlain & Knull, 1922^{i c g b}
- Chrysobothris yemenensis Bílý, 2000^{c g}
- Chrysobothris yucatanensis Van Dyke, 1953^{c g}
- Chrysobothris yunnanensis Théry, 1940^{c g}
- Chrysobothris znojkoi Semenov & Richter, 1934^{c g}
- Chrysobothris zubaci Obenberger, 1932^{c g}

Data sources: i = ITIS, c = Catalogue of Life, g = GBIF, b = Bugguide.net
