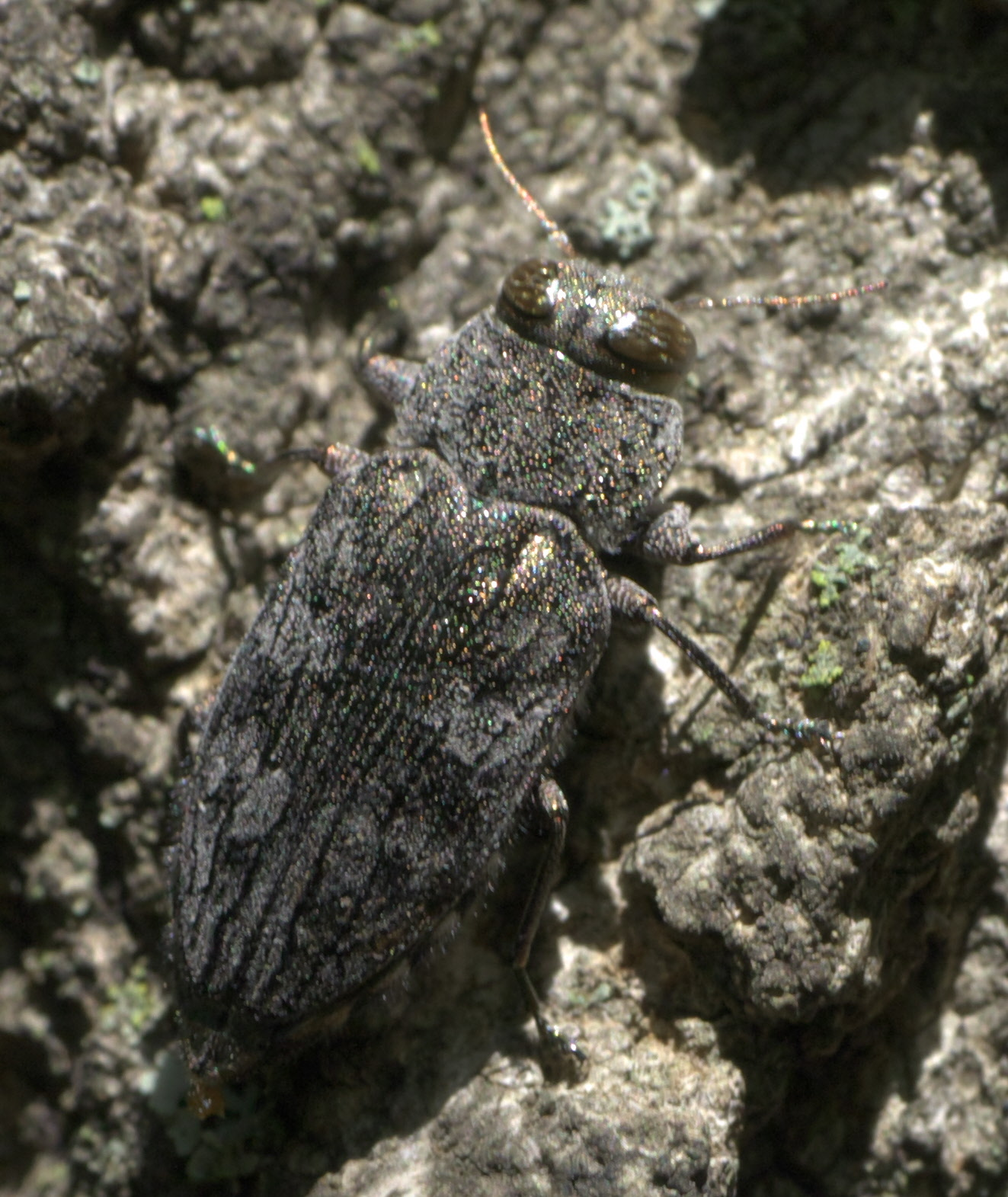

Scientific classification
- Kingdom: Animalia
- Phylum: Arthropoda
- Clade: Pancrustacea
- Class: Insecta
- Order: Coleoptera
- Suborder: Polyphaga
- Infraorder: Elateriformia
- Family: Buprestidae
- Genus: Chrysobothris
- Species: C. shawnee

Binomial name
- Chrysobothris shawnee Wellso & Manley, 2007

= Chrysobothris shawnee =

Species of beetle

Chrysobothris shawnee is a species of metallic wood-boring beetle in the family Buprestidae. It is found in North America.

This species occurs on large branches and trunks of dead oak trees along with Chrysobothris rugosiceps. Researches also found few specimens from cut sugarberry, Celtis laevigata Willd, trees in the vicinity of cut oaks.
