= Chrysobothris tranquebarica =

Scientific classification
- Kingdom: Animalia
- Phylum: Arthropoda
- Clade: Pancrustacea
- Class: Insecta
- Order: Coleoptera
- Suborder: Polyphaga
- Infraorder: Elateriformia
- Family: Buprestidae
- Genus: Chrysobothris
- Species: C. tranquebarica

Binomial name
- Chrysobothris tranquebarica (Gmelin, 1788)

Synonyms
- Chrysobothris denticulata Gory and Laporte, 1837

Species of insectbeetle

Chrysobothris tranquebarica, known generally as the Australian pine borer or mangrove borer, is a species of metallic wood-boring beetle in the family Buprestidae. It is found in the Caribbean Sea and North America.
