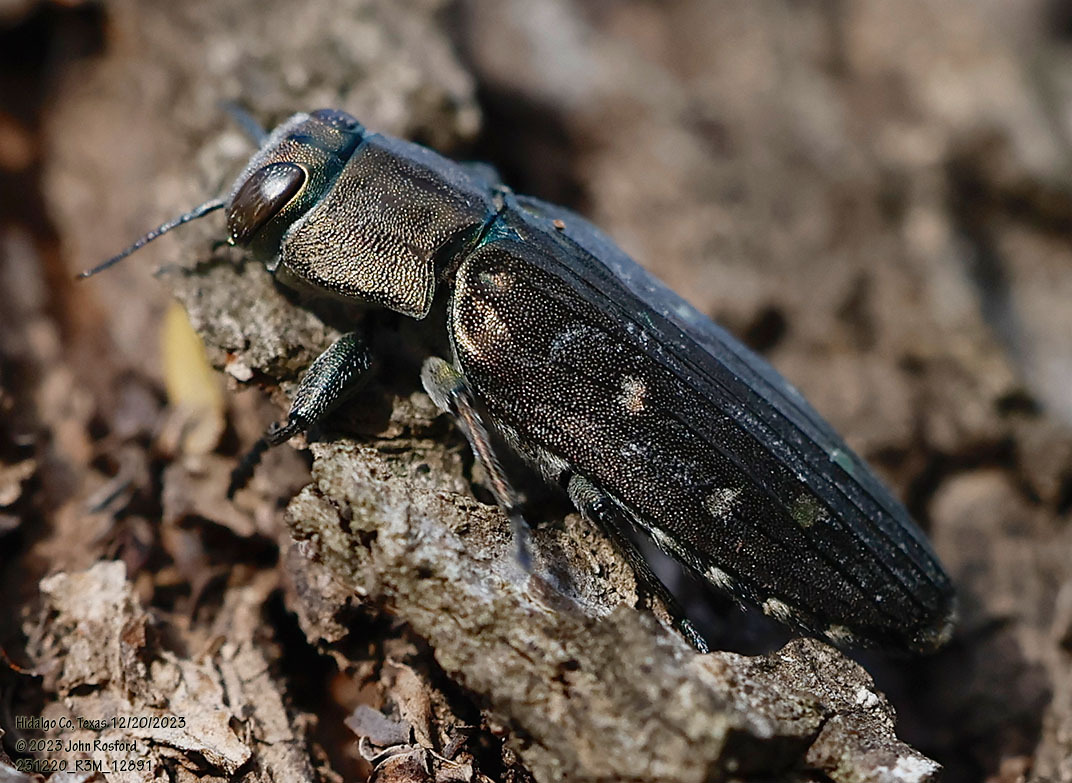

Scientific classification
- Kingdom: Animalia
- Phylum: Arthropoda
- Clade: Pancrustacea
- Class: Insecta
- Order: Coleoptera
- Suborder: Polyphaga
- Infraorder: Elateriformia
- Family: Buprestidae
- Genus: Chrysobothris
- Species: C. octocola

Binomial name
- Chrysobothris octocola LeConte, 1858

Synonyms
- Chrysobothris caviventris Théry, 1926

= Chrysobothris octocola =

Species of beetle

Chrysobothris octocola is a species of metallic wood-boring beetle in the family Buprestidae. It is found in Central America, North America, and Oceania.
