= Chrysobothris caurina =

Scientific classification
- Kingdom: Animalia
- Phylum: Arthropoda
- Clade: Pancrustacea
- Class: Insecta
- Order: Coleoptera
- Suborder: Polyphaga
- Infraorder: Elateriformia
- Family: Buprestidae
- Genus: Chrysobothris
- Species: C. caurina

Binomial name
- Chrysobothris caurina Horn, 1886

Synonyms
- Chrysobothris beeri Barr, 1969

Species of beetle

Chrysobothris caurina is a species of metallic wood-boring beetle in the family Buprestidae. It is found in North America.
