= Chrysobothris speculifer =

Scientific classification
- Kingdom: Animalia
- Phylum: Arthropoda
- Clade: Pancrustacea
- Class: Insecta
- Order: Coleoptera
- Suborder: Polyphaga
- Infraorder: Elateriformia
- Family: Buprestidae
- Genus: Chrysobothris
- Species: C. speculifer

Binomial name
- Chrysobothris speculifer Horn, 1886

Species of beetle

Chrysobothris speculifer is a species of metallic wood-boring beetle in the family Buprestidae. It is found in North America.
