= Chrysobothris purpureovittata =

Scientific classification
- Kingdom: Animalia
- Phylum: Arthropoda
- Clade: Pancrustacea
- Class: Insecta
- Order: Coleoptera
- Suborder: Polyphaga
- Infraorder: Elateriformia
- Family: Buprestidae
- Genus: Chrysobothris
- Species: C. purpureovittata

Binomial name
- Chrysobothris purpureovittata Horn, 1886

Species of beetle

Chrysobothris purpureovittata is a species of metallic wood-boring beetle in the family Buprestidae. It is found in North America.

== Subspecies ==
These two subspecies belong to the species Chrysobothris purpureovittata:

- Chrysobothris purpureovittata cercocarpi Westcott & Nelson, 2000
- Chrysobothris purpureovittata purpureovittata Horn, 1886
