= Chrysobothris costifrons =

Scientific classification
- Kingdom: Animalia
- Phylum: Arthropoda
- Clade: Pancrustacea
- Class: Insecta
- Order: Coleoptera
- Suborder: Polyphaga
- Infraorder: Elateriformia
- Family: Buprestidae
- Genus: Chrysobothris
- Species: C. costifrons

Binomial name
- Chrysobothris costifrons Waterhouse, 1887

Species of beetle

Chrysobothris costifrons is a species of metallic wood-boring beetle in the family Buprestidae. It is found in Central America and North America.

== Subspecies ==
These three subspecies belong to the species Chrysobothris costifrons:

- Chrysobothris costifrons baja Westcott, 1983
- Chrysobothris costifrons costifrons Waterhouse, 1887
- Chrysobothris costifrons rubiterga Westcott, 1983
