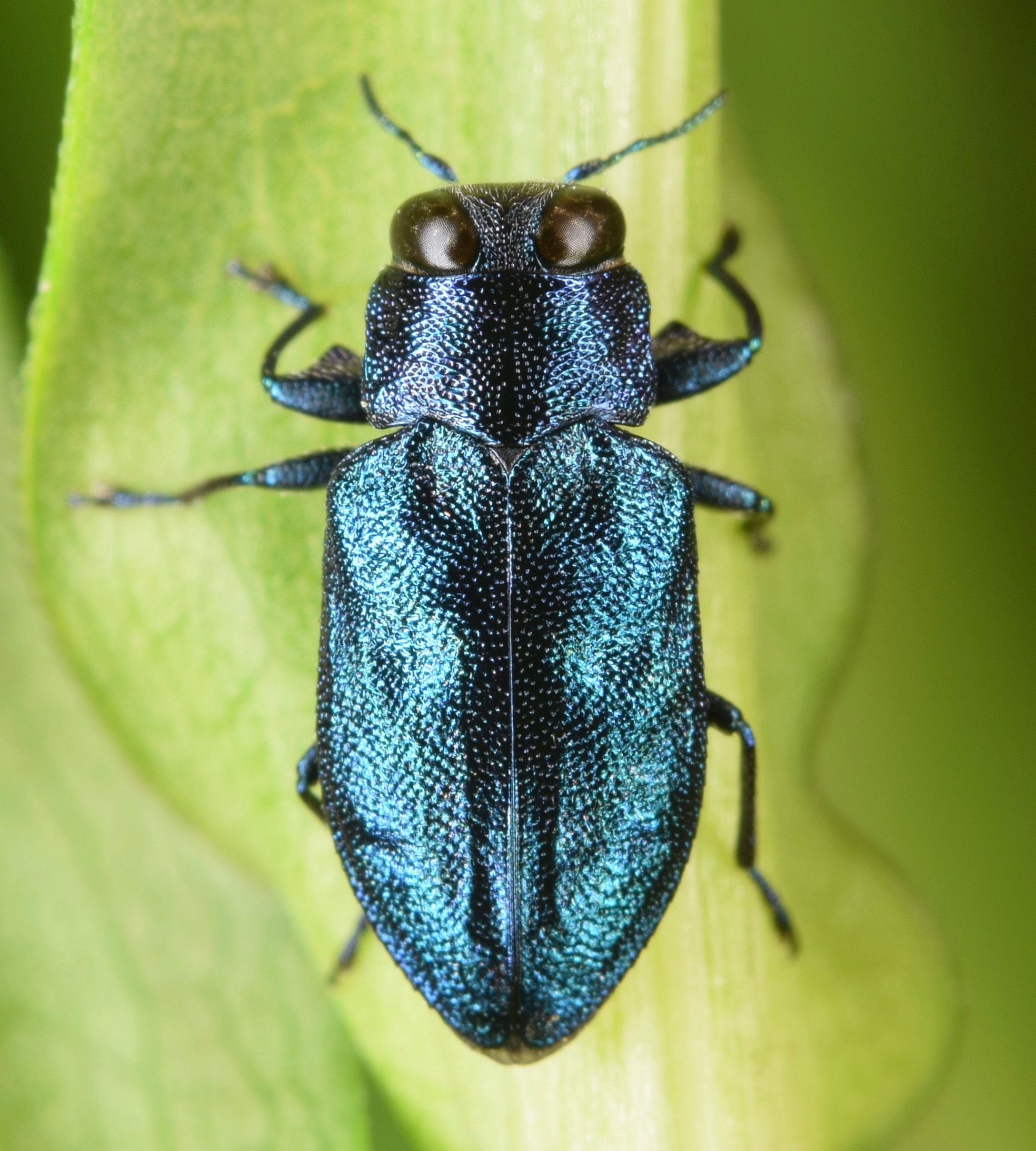

Scientific classification
- Kingdom: Animalia
- Phylum: Arthropoda
- Clade: Pancrustacea
- Class: Insecta
- Order: Coleoptera
- Suborder: Polyphaga
- Infraorder: Elateriformia
- Family: Buprestidae
- Genus: Chrysobothris
- Species: C. harrisi

Binomial name
- Chrysobothris harrisi (Hentz, 1827)

= Chrysobothris harrisi =

Species of beetle

Chrysobothris harrisi (sometimes misspelled as "harrisii") is a species of metallic wood-boring beetle in the family Buprestidae.
