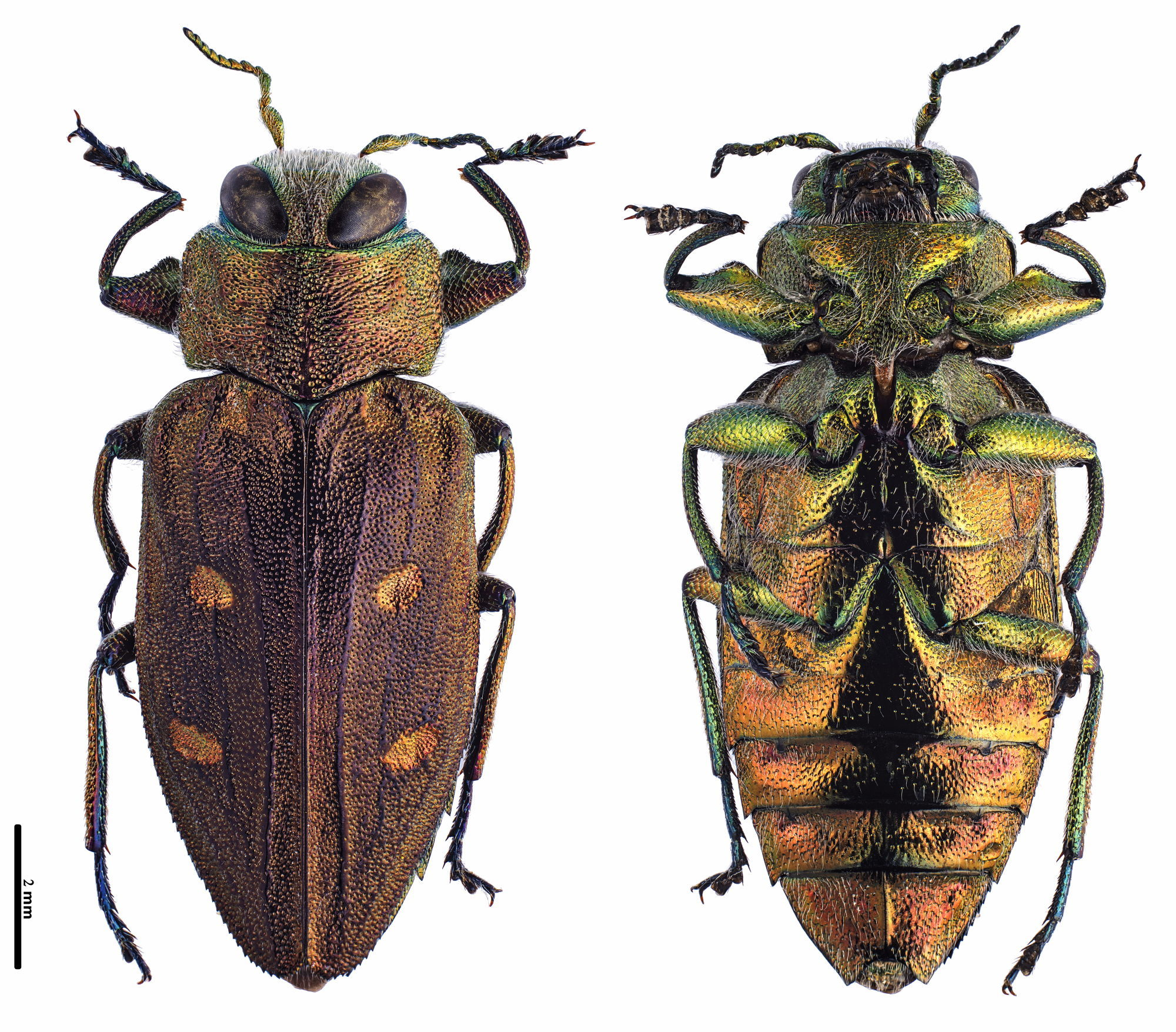

Scientific classification
- Kingdom: Animalia
- Phylum: Arthropoda
- Clade: Pancrustacea
- Class: Insecta
- Order: Coleoptera
- Suborder: Polyphaga
- Infraorder: Elateriformia
- Family: Buprestidae
- Genus: Chrysobothris
- Species: C. affinis

Binomial name
- Chrysobothris affinis (Fabricius, 1794)

= Chrysobothris affinis =

Species of beetle

Chrysobothris affinis is a species from the genus Chrysobothris. The species was first described in 1794 by Johan Christian Fabricius.
