= Chrysobothris ephedrae =

Scientific classification
- Kingdom: Animalia
- Phylum: Arthropoda
- Clade: Pancrustacea
- Class: Insecta
- Order: Coleoptera
- Suborder: Polyphaga
- Infraorder: Elateriformia
- Family: Buprestidae
- Genus: Chrysobothris
- Species: C. ephedrae

Binomial name
- Chrysobothris ephedrae Knull, 1942

Species of beetle

Chrysobothris ephedrae is a species of metallic wood-boring beetle in the family Buprestidae. It is found in North America.

== Subspecies ==
These two subspecies belong to the species Chrysobothris ephedrae:

- Chrysobothris ephedrae ephedrae Knull, 1942
- Chrysobothris ephedrae vogti Knull, 1964
