= Chrysobothris chrysoela =

Scientific classification
- Kingdom: Animalia
- Phylum: Arthropoda
- Clade: Pancrustacea
- Class: Insecta
- Order: Coleoptera
- Suborder: Polyphaga
- Infraorder: Elateriformia
- Family: Buprestidae
- Genus: Chrysobothris
- Species: C. chrysoela

Binomial name
- Chrysobothris chrysoela (Illiger, 1800)

Synonyms
- Chrysobothris hybernata (Fabricius, 1801); Chrysobothris viridipunctata Gory and Laporte, 1837

Species of beetle

Chrysobothris chrysoela is a species of metallic wood-boring beetle in the family Buprestidae. It is found in North America.

== Subspecies ==
These two subspecies belong to the species Chrysobothris chrysoela:

- Chrysobothris chrysoela chrysoela
- Chrysobothris chrysoela lerneri Cazier, 1951
