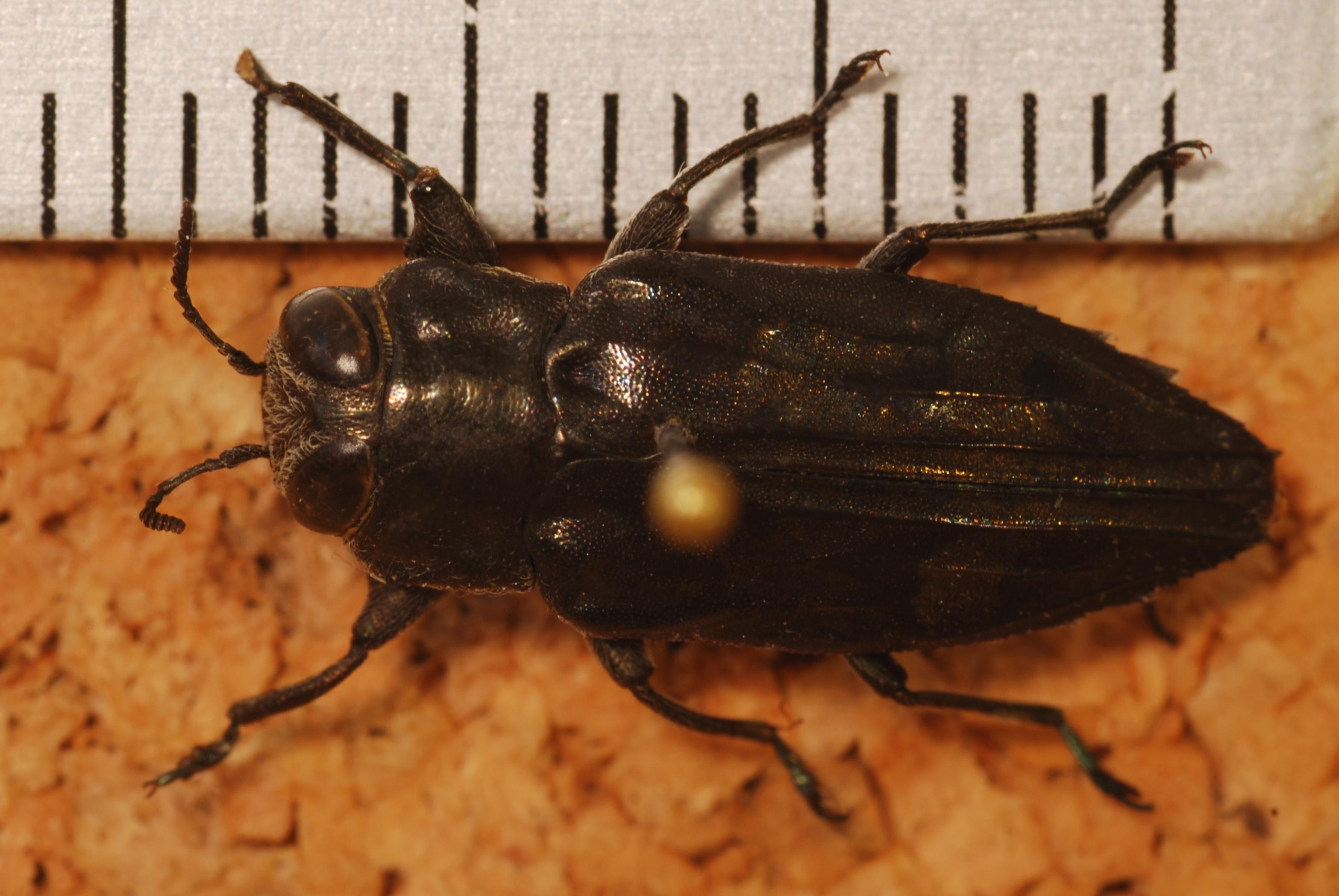

Scientific classification
- Kingdom: Animalia
- Phylum: Arthropoda
- Clade: Pancrustacea
- Class: Insecta
- Order: Coleoptera
- Suborder: Polyphaga
- Infraorder: Elateriformia
- Family: Buprestidae
- Genus: Chrysobothris
- Species: C. acutipennis

Binomial name
- Chrysobothris acutipennis Chevrolat, 1835

Synonyms
- Chrysobothris acuminata LeConte, 1860; Chrysobothris cupreoaenea Gory and Laporte, 1837

= Chrysobothris acutipennis =

Species of beetle

Chrysobothris acutipennis is a species of metallic wood-boring beetle in the family Buprestidae. It is found in Central America, North America, and South America.
