= Chrysobothris scabripennis =

Scientific classification
- Kingdom: Animalia
- Phylum: Arthropoda
- Clade: Pancrustacea
- Class: Insecta
- Order: Coleoptera
- Suborder: Polyphaga
- Infraorder: Elateriformia
- Family: Buprestidae
- Genus: Chrysobothris
- Species: C. scabripennis

Binomial name
- Chrysobothris scabripennis Gory & Laporte, 1837

Synonyms
- Chrysobothris proxima Kirby, 1837; Chrysobothris scabra Gory, 1841

Species of beetle

Chrysobothris scabripennis is a species of metallic wood-boring beetle in the family Buprestidae. It is found in North America.
