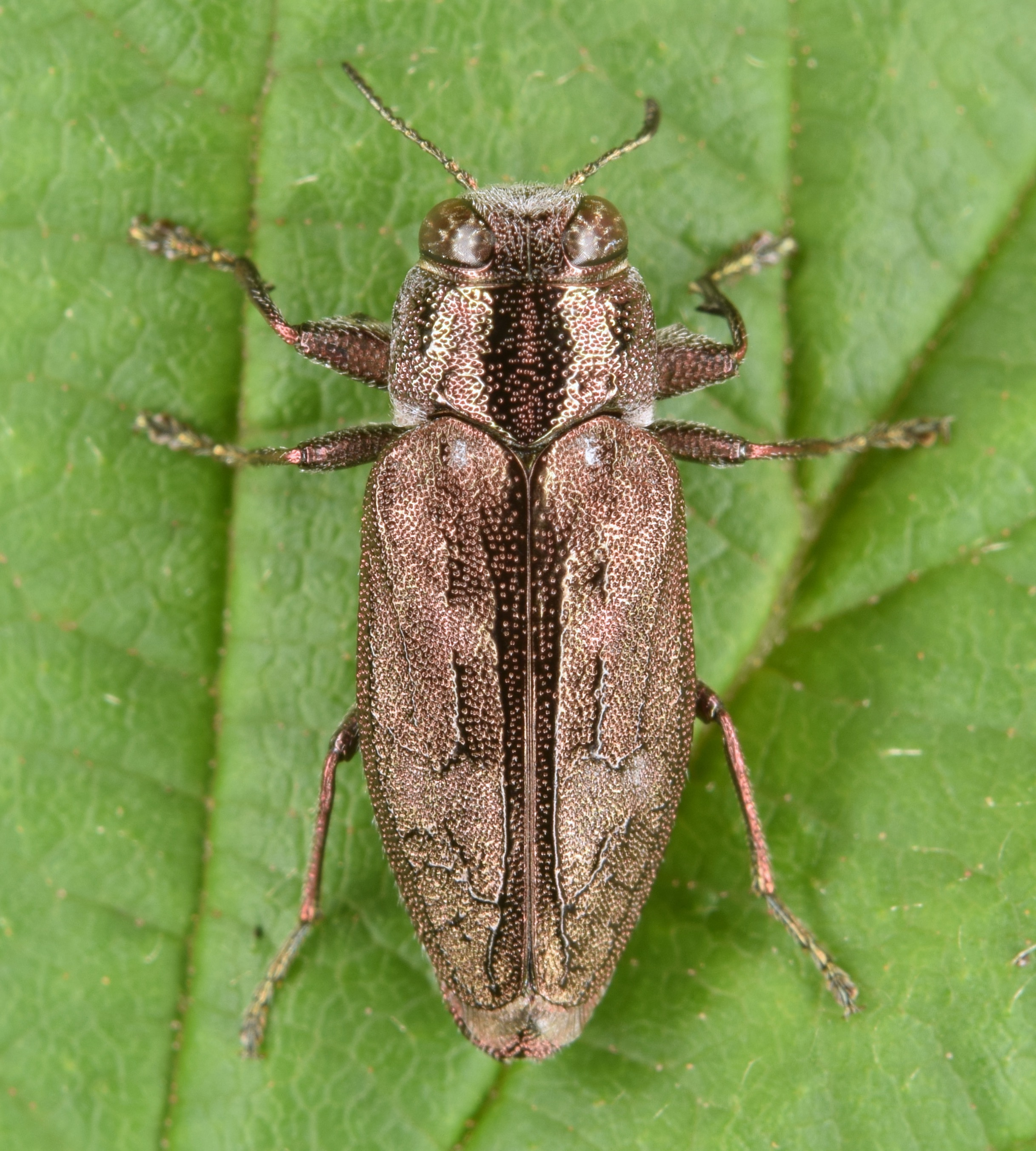

Scientific classification
- Kingdom: Animalia
- Phylum: Arthropoda
- Clade: Pancrustacea
- Class: Insecta
- Order: Coleoptera
- Suborder: Polyphaga
- Infraorder: Elateriformia
- Family: Buprestidae
- Genus: Chrysobothris
- Species: C. cribraria

Binomial name
- Chrysobothris cribraria Mannerheim, 1837

Synonyms
- Chrysobothris calcarata Melsheimer, 1845; Chrysobothris floricola Gory, 1841; Chrysobothris lata Kerremans, 1899

= Chrysobothris cribraria =

Species of beetle

Chrysobothris cribraria is a species of metallic wood-boring beetle in the family Buprestidae. It is found in North America.
