= Chrysobothris dentipes =

Scientific classification
- Kingdom: Animalia
- Phylum: Arthropoda
- Clade: Pancrustacea
- Class: Insecta
- Order: Coleoptera
- Suborder: Polyphaga
- Infraorder: Elateriformia
- Family: Buprestidae
- Genus: Chrysobothris
- Species: C. dentipes

Binomial name
- Chrysobothris dentipes (Germar, 1824)

Synonyms
- Chrysobothris characteristica Harris, 1829; Chrysobothris planata Gory and Laporte, 1837; Chrysobothris posticalis Gory and Laporte, 1837

Species of beetle

Chrysobothris dentipes is a species of metallic wood-boring beetle in the family Buprestidae. It is found in the Caribbean Sea, Central America, and North America.
