= List of Ranunculales of South Africa =

Flowering plants in the order Ranunculales recorded from South Africa

Ranunculales is an order of flowering plants in the eudicots. It is the most basal clade in this group – it is the sister taxon to the remaining eudicots. The anthophytes are a grouping of plant taxa bearing flower-like reproductive structures. They were formerly thought to be a clade comprising plants bearing flower-like structures. The group contained the angiosperms - the extant flowering plants, such as roses and grasses - as well as the Gnetales and the extinct Bennettitales.

23,420 species of vascular plant have been recorded in South Africa, making it the sixth most species-rich country in the world and the most species-rich country on the African continent. Of these, 153 species are considered to be threatened. Nine biomes have been described in South Africa: Fynbos, Succulent Karoo, desert, Nama Karoo, grassland, savanna, Albany thickets, the Indian Ocean coastal belt, and forests.

The 2018 South African National Biodiversity Institute's National Biodiversity Assessment plant checklist lists 35,130 taxa in the phyla Anthocerotophyta (hornworts (6)), Anthophyta (flowering plants (33534)), Bryophyta (mosses (685)), Cycadophyta (cycads (42)), Lycopodiophyta (Lycophytes(45)), Marchantiophyta (liverworts (376)), Pinophyta (conifers (33)), and Pteridophyta (cryptogams (408)).

Five families are represented in the literature. Listed taxa include species, subspecies, varieties, and forms as recorded, some of which have subsequently been allocated to other taxa as synonyms, in which cases the accepted taxon is appended to the listing. Multiple entries under alternative names reflect taxonomic revision over time.

== Berberidaceae ==
Family: Berberidaceae,

=== Berberis ===
Genus Berberis:

- Berberis aristata DC. not indigenous, naturalised
- Berberis julianae C.K.Schneid. not indigenous, cultivated, naturalised, invasive
- Berberis thunbergii DC. not indigenous, naturalised, invasive

=== Mahonia ===
Genus Mahonia:

- Mahonia oiwakensis Hayata, not indigenous, cultivated, naturalised

=== Nandina ===
Genus Nandina:

- Nandina domestica Thunb. not indigenous, cultivated, naturalised, invasive

== Fumariaceae ==
Family: Fumariaceae,

=== Cysticapnos ===
Genus Cysticapnos:

- Cysticapnos cracca (Cham. & Schltdl.) Liden, endemic
- Cysticapnos grandiflora Bernh. accepted as Cysticapnos vesicaria (L.) Fedde subsp. vesicaria, present
- Cysticapnos parviflora Liden, accepted as Cysticapnos vesicaria (L.) Fedde subsp. namaquensis J.C.Manning & Goldblatt, endemic
- Cysticapnos pruinosa (Bernh.) Liden, indigenous
- Cysticapnos vesicaria (L.) Fedde, indigenous
  - Cysticapnos vesicaria (L.) Fedde forma brevilobus Fedde, accepted as Cysticapnos vesicaria (L.) Fedde subsp. vesicaria, present
  - Cysticapnos vesicaria (L.) Fedde forma longilobus Fedde, accepted as Cysticapnos vesicaria (L.) Fedde subsp. vesicaria, present
  - Cysticapnos vesicaria (L.) Fedde subsp. namaquensis J.C.Manning & Goldblatt, indigenous
  - Cysticapnos vesicaria (L.) Fedde subsp. vesicaria, indigenous

=== Discocapnos ===
Genus Discocapnos:

- Discocapnos mundii Cham. & Schltdl. endemic
  - Discocapnos mundii Cham. & Schltdl. subsp. dregei (Harv.) J.C.Manning & Goldblatt, endemic
  - Discocapnos mundii Cham. & Schltdl. subsp. mundii, indigenous

=== Fumaria ===
Genus Fumaria:

- Fumaria capreolata L. not indigenous, naturalised
- Fumaria muralis Sond. ex W.D.J.Koch subsp. muralis, not indigenous, naturalised, invasive
- Fumaria parviflora Lam. var. parviflora, not indigenous, naturalised

=== Phacocapnos ===
Genus Phacocapnos:

- Phacocapnos dregeanus Bernh. accepted as Cysticapnos cracca (Cham. & Schltdl.) Liden, present

=== Trigonocapnos ===
Genus Trigonocapnos:

- Trigonocapnos curvipes Schltr. accepted as Trigonocapnos lichtensteinii (Cham. & Schltdl.) Liden, present
- Trigonocapnos lichtensteinii (Cham. & Schltdl.) Liden, endemic

== Menispermaceae ==
Family: Menispermaceae,

=== Albertisia ===
Genus Albertisia:

- Albertisia delagoensis (N.E.Br.) Forman, indigenous

=== Antizoma ===
Genus Antizoma:

- Antizoma angustifolia (Burch.) Miers ex Harv. indigenous
- Antizoma miersiana Harv. indigenous

=== Cissampelos ===
Genus Cissampelos:

- Cissampelos capensis L.f. indigenous
- Cissampelos hirta Klotzsch, indigenous
- Cissampelos mucronata A.Rich. indigenous
- Cissampelos torulosa E.Mey. ex Harv. indigenous

=== Cocculus ===
Genus Cocculus:

- Cocculus hirsutus (L.) Diels, not indigenous, naturalised

=== Stephania ===
Genus Stephania:

- Stephania abyssinica (Quart.-Dill. & A.Rich.) Walp. indigenous
  - Stephania abyssinica (Quart.-Dill. & A.Rich.) Walp. var. abyssinica, indigenous
  - Stephania abyssinica (Quart.-Dill. & A.Rich.) Walp. var. tomentella (Oliv.) Diels, indigenous

=== Tiliacora ===
Genus Tiliacora:

- Tiliacora funifera (Miers) Oliv. indigenous

=== Tinospora ===
Genus Tinospora:

- Tinospora caffra (Miers) Troupin, indigenous
- Tinospora fragosa (I.Verd.) I.Verd. & Troupin, indigenous
  - Tinospora fragosa (I.Verd.) I.Verd. & Troupin subsp. fragosa, indigenous
- Tinospora tenera Miers, indigenous

== Papaveraceae ==
- Family: Papaveraceae,

=== Argemone ===
Genus Argemone:

- Argemone albiflora Hornem. subsp. texana G.B.Ownbey, not indigenous, naturalised, invasive
- Argemone mexicana L. not indigenous, naturalised, invasive
  - Argemone mexicana L. forma mexicana, not indigenous, naturalised, invasive
- Argemone ochroleuca Sweet, not indigenous, naturalised, invasive
  - Argemone ochroleuca Sweet subsp. ochroleuca, not indigenous, naturalised, invasive

=== Bocconia ===
Genus Bocconia:

- Bocconia frutescens L. not indigenous, cultivated, naturalised

=== Eschscholzia ===
Genus Eschscholzia:

- Eschscholzia californica Cham. subsp. californica, not indigenous, cultivated, naturalised

=== Glaucium ===
Genus Glaucium:

- Glaucium corniculatum (L.) Rudolph, not indigenous, naturalised

=== Papaver ===
Genus Papaver:

- Papaver aculeatum Thunb. indigenous
- Papaver argemone L. not indigenous, naturalised
- Papaver hybridum L. not indigenous, naturalised
- Papaver rhoeas L. not indigenous, naturalised

== Ranunculaceae ==
- Family: Ranunculaceae,

=== Adonis ===
Genus Adonis:

- Adonis capensis L. accepted as Anemone knowltonia Burtt Davy, indigenous
- Adonis filia L.f. accepted as Anemone filia (L.f.) J.C.Manning & Goldblatt subsp. filia, indigenous
- Adonis vesicatoria L.f. accepted as Anemone vesicatoria (L.f.) Prantl subsp. vesicatoria, indigenous

=== Anamenia ===
Genus Anamenia:

- Anamenia capensis (L.f.) Hoffmanns. accepted as Anemone knowltonia Burtt Davy, indigenous
- Anamenia gracilis Vent. accepted as Anemone knowltonia Burtt Davy, indigenous

=== Anemone ===
Genus Anemone:

- Anemone alchemillifolia E.Mey. ex Pritz. accepted as Anemone caffra (Eckl. & Zeyh.) Harv. indigenous
  - Anemone alchemillifolia E.Mey. ex Pritz. var. caffra (Eckl. & Zeyh.) Huth, accepted as Anemone caffra (Eckl. & Zeyh.) Harv. indigenous
  - Anemone alchemillifolia E.Mey. ex Pritz. var. grandiflora Huth, accepted as Anemone caffra (Eckl. & Zeyh.) Harv. indigenous
  - Anemone alchemillifolia E.Mey. ex Pritz. var. schlechteriana Huth, accepted as Anemone caffra (Eckl. & Zeyh.) Harv. indigenous
- Anemone anemonoides (H.Rasm.) J.C.Manning & Goldblatt, indigenous
  - Anemone anemonoides (H.Rasm.) J.C.Manning & Goldblatt subsp. anemonoides, endemic
  - Anemone anemonoides (H.Rasm.) J.C.Manning & Goldblatt subsp. tenuis (H.Rasm.) J.C.Manning & Goldblat, endemic
- Anemone arborea Steud. accepted as Anemone tenuifolia (L.f.) DC.
- Anemone bracteata (Harv. ex J.Zahlbr.) J.C.Manning & Goldblatt, endemic
- Anemone brevistylis (Szyszyl.) J.C.Manning & Goldblatt, endemic
- Anemone caffra (Eckl. & Zeyh.) Harv. endemic
  - Anemone caffra (Eckl. & Zeyh.) Harv. var. pondoensis Ulbr. accepted as Anemone caffra (Eckl. & Zeyh.) Harv. indigenous
- Anemone canescens (Szyszyl.) Burtt Davy, accepted as Anemone transvaalensis (Szyszyl.) Burtt Davy var. transvaalensis, indigenous
- Anemone capensis (L.) DC. accepted as Anemone tenuifolia (L.f.) DC.
- Anemone capensis Lam. accepted as Anemone tenuifolia (L.f.) DC. indigenous
- Anemone cordata (H.Rasm.) J.C.Manning & Goldblatt, endemic
- Anemone fanninii Harv. ex Mast. indigenous
  - Anemone fanninii Harv. ex Mast. var. mafubensis Beauverd, accepted as Anemone fanninii Harv. ex Mast. indigenous
  - Anemone fanninii Harv. ex Mast. var. parviflora Ulbr. accepted as Anemone fanninii Harv. ex Mast. indigenous
- Anemone filia (L.f.) J.C.Manning & Goldblatt, endemic
  - Anemone filia (L.f.) J.C.Manning & Goldblatt subsp. filia, endemic
  - Anemone filia (L.f.) J.C.Manning & Goldblatt subsp. scaposa (H.Rasm.) J.C.Manning & Goldblatt, endemic
- Anemone knowltonia Burtt Davy, endemic
- Anemone peenensis Baker f. accepted as Anemone transvaalensis (Szyszyl.) Burtt Davy var. transvaalensis
- Anemone tenuifolia (L.f.) DC. endemic
- Anemone transvaalensis (Szyszyl.) Burtt Davy, indigenous
  - Anemone transvaalensis (Szyszyl.) Burtt Davy var. filifolia (H.Rasm.) J.C.Manning & Goldblatt, endemic
  - Anemone transvaalensis (Szyszyl.) Burtt Davy var. pottiana (Burtt Davy) J.C.Manning & Goldblatt, endemic
  - Anemone transvaalensis (Szyszyl.) Burtt Davy var. transvaalensis, indigenous
- Anemone vesicatoria (L.f.) Prantl, endemic
  - Anemone vesicatoria (L.f.) Prantl subsp. grossa (H.Rasm.) J.C.Manning & Goldblatt, endemic
  - Anemone vesicatoria (L.f.) Prantl subsp. humilis (H.Rasm.) J.C.Manning & Goldblatt, endemic
  - Anemone vesicatoria (L.f.) Prantl subsp. vesicatoria, endemic
- Anemone whyteana Baker f. accepted as Anemone transvaalensis (Szyszyl.) Burtt Davy var. transvaalensis

=== Atragene ===
Genus Atragene:

- Atragene capensis L. accepted as Anemone tenuifolia (L.f.) DC. indigenous
- Atragene tenuifolia L.f. accepted as Anemone tenuifolia (L.f.) DC.
- Atragene tenuis Thunb. accepted as Anemone tenuifolia (L.f.) DC. indigenous

=== Batrachium ===
Genus Batrachium:

- Batrachium trichophyllus (Chaix) Bosch, accepted as Ranunculus trichophyllus Chaix, indigenous

=== Clematis ===
Genus Clematis:

- Clematis bowkeri Burtt Davy ex W.T.Wang, endemic
- Clematis brachiata Thunb. indigenous
  - Clematis brachiata Thunb. var. burkei Burtt Davy, accepted as Clematis brachiata Thunb. indigenous
  - Clematis brachiata Thunb. var. oweniae (Harv.) Durand & Schinz, accepted as Clematis oweniae Harv. indigenous
- Clematis capensis (L.) Poir. accepted as Anemone tenuifolia (L.f.) DC.
- Clematis commutata Kuntze var. glabrisepala W.T.Wang, accepted as Clematis bowkeri Burtt Davy ex W.T.Wang, indigenous
- Clematis hirsuta Perr. & Guill. indigenous
  - Clematis hirsuta Perr. & Guill. var. junodii (Burtt Davy) W.T.Wang, indigenous
- Clematis massoniana DC. endemic
- Clematis orientalis L. subsp. thunbergii (Steud.) Kuntze, accepted as Clematis triloba Thunb. indigenous
  - Clematis orientalis L. subsp. thunbergii (Steud.) Kuntze var. oweniae, accepted as Clematis oweniae Harv. indigenous
  - Clematis orientalis L. var. albida (Klotzsch) Kuntze forma massoniana, accepted as Clematis massoniana DC. indigenous
- Clematis oweniae Harv. indigenous
  - Clematis oweniae Harv. var. junodii Burtt Davy, accepted as Clematis hirsuta Perr. & Guill. var. junodii (Burtt Davy) W.T.Wang, indigenous
- Clematis stanleyi Hook. accepted as Clematis villosa DC. subsp. stanleyi (Hook.) Kuntze, indigenous
- Clematis stewartiae Burtt Davy, accepted as Clematis brachiata Thunb. indigenous
  - Clematis stewartiae Burtt Davy var. wilmsii Burtt Davy, accepted as Clematis brachiata Thunb. indigenous
- Clematis tenuifolia (L.f.) Poir. accepted as Anemone tenuifolia (L.f.) DC.
- Clematis thunbergii Steud. accepted as Clematis triloba Thunb. indigenous
- Clematis triloba Thunb. indigenous
- Clematis villosa DC. indigenous
  - Clematis villosa DC. subsp. stanleyi (Hook.) Kuntze, indigenous

=== Clematopsis ===
Genus Clematopsis:

- Clematopsis scabiosifolia (DC.) Hutch. subsp. stanleyi (Hook.) Brummitt, accepted as Clematis villosa DC. subsp. stanleyi (Hook.) Kuntze, indigenous
- Clematopsis stanleyi (Hook.) Hutch. accepted as Clematis villosa DC. subsp. stanleyi (Hook.) Kuntze, indigenous
- Clematopsis villosa (DC.) Hutch. subsp. stanleyi (Hook.) J.Raynal & Brummitt, accepted as Clematis villosa DC. subsp. stanleyi (Hook.) Kuntze, indigenous

=== Knowltonia ===
Genus Knowltonia:

- Knowltonia anemonoides H.Rasm. accepted as Anemone anemonoides (H.Rasm.) J.C.Manning & Goldblatt subsp. anemonoides, endemic
  - Knowltonia anemonoides H.Rasm. subsp. tenuis H.Rasm. accepted as Anemone anemonoides (H.Rasm.) J.C.Manning & Goldblatt subsp. tenuis (H.Rasm.) J.C.Manning & Goldblat, endemic
- Knowltonia bracteata Harv. ex J.Zahlbr. accepted as Anemone bracteata (Harv. ex J.Zahlbr.) J.C.Manning & Goldblatt, endemic
- Knowltonia brevistylis Szyszyl. accepted as Anemone brevistylis (Szyszyl.) J.C.Manning & Goldblatt, endemic
- Knowltonia canescens Szyszyl. accepted as Anemone transvaalensis (Szyszyl.) Burtt Davy var. transvaalensis
  - Knowltonia canescens Szyszyl. var. pottiana Burtt Davy, accepted as Anemone transvaalensis (Szyszyl.) Burtt Davy var. pottiana (Burtt Davy) J.C.Manning & Goldblatt, indigenous
- Knowltonia capensis (L.) Huth, accepted as Anemone knowltonia Burtt Davy, endemic
- Knowltonia cordata H.Rasm. accepted as Anemone cordata (H.Rasm.) J.C.Manning & Goldblatt, endemic
- Knowltonia filia (L.f.) T.Durand & Schinz, accepted as Anemone filia (L.f.) J.C.Manning & Goldblatt subsp. filia, indigenous
  - Knowltonia filia (L.f.) T.Durand & Schinz subsp. scaposa H.Rasm. accepted as Anemone filia (L.f.) J.C.Manning & Goldblatt subsp. scaposa (H.Rasm.) J.C.Manning & Goldblatt, endemic
- Knowltonia gracilis (Vent.) DC. accepted as Anemone knowltonia Burtt Davy, indigenous
- Knowltonia multiflora Burtt Davy, accepted as Anemone transvaalensis (Szyszyl.) Burtt Davy var. transvaalensis
- Knowltonia transvaalensis Szyszyl. accepted as Anemone transvaalensis (Szyszyl.) Burtt Davy var. transvaalensis, indigenous
  - Knowltonia transvaalensis Szyszyl. var. filifolia H.Rasm. accepted as Anemone transvaalensis (Szyszyl.) Burtt Davy var. filifolia (H.Rasm.) J.C.Manning & Goldblatt, endemic
  - Knowltonia transvaalensis Szyszyl. var. pottiana (Burtt Davy) H.Rasm. accepted as Anemone transvaalensis (Szyszyl.) Burtt Davy var. pottiana (Burtt Davy) J.C.Manning & Goldblatt, endemic
- Knowltonia vesicatoria (L.f.) Sims, accepted as Anemone vesicatoria (L.f.) Prantl subsp. vesicatoria, indigenous
  - Knowltonia vesicatoria (L.f.) Sims subsp. grossa H.Rasm. accepted as Anemone vesicatoria (L.f.) Prantl subsp. grossa (H.Rasm.) J.C.Manning & Goldblatt, endemic
  - Knowltonia vesicatoria (L.f.) Sims subsp. humilis H.Rasm. accepted as Anemone vesicatoria (L.f.) Prantl subsp. humilis (H.Rasm.) J.C.Manning & Goldblatt, endemic
- Knowltonia whyteana (Baker f.) Engl. accepted as Anemone transvaalensis (Szyszyl.) Burtt Davy var. transvaalensis

=== Myosurus ===
Genus Myosurus:

- Myosurus minimus L. not indigenous, naturalised
- Myosurus minimus L. subsp. heldreichii (H.Lev.) O.BolÃ²s & Vigo, not indigenous, naturalised, invasive

=== Peltocalathos ===
Genus Peltocalathos:

- Peltocalathos baurii (MacOwan) Tamura, indigenous

=== Pulsatilla ===
Genus Pulsatilla:

- Pulsatilla africana Herm. ex Spreng. accepted as Anemone tenuifolia (L.f.) DC.
- Pulsatilla tenuifolia (L.f.) Spreng. accepted as Anemone tenuifolia (L.f.) DC.

=== Ranunculus ===
Genus Ranunculus:

- Ranunculus baurii MacOwan, accepted as Peltocalathos baurii (MacOwan) Tamura, indigenous
- Ranunculus capensis Thunb. accepted as Ranunculus multifidus Forssk. endemic
- Ranunculus cooperi Oliv. accepted as Peltocalathos baurii (MacOwan) Tamura, indigenous
- Ranunculus dregei J.C.Manning & Goldblatt, indigenous
- Ranunculus meyeri Harv. accepted as Ranunculus dregei J.C.Manning & Goldblatt, indigenous
  - Ranunculus meyeri Harv. var. rogersii Burtt Davy, accepted as Ranunculus dregei J.C.Manning & Goldblatt, present
  - Ranunculus meyeri Harv. var. transvaalensis Szyszyl. accepted as Ranunculus dregei J.C.Manning & Goldblatt, indigenous
- Ranunculus multifidus Forssk. indigenous
- Ranunculus muricatus L. not indigenous, naturalised, invasive
- Ranunculus pinnatus Poir. var. hermannii DC. accepted as Ranunculus multifidus Forssk. indigenous
- Ranunculus pubescens Thunb. accepted as Ranunculus multifidus Forssk. indigenous
  - Ranunculus pubescens Thunb. var. glabrescens Burtt Davy, accepted as Ranunculus multifidus Forssk. indigenous
  - Ranunculus pubescens Thunb. var. harveyanus Burtt Davy, accepted as Ranunculus multifidus Forssk. indigenous
- Ranunculus trichophyllus Chaix, indigenous

=== Thalictrum ===
Genus Thalictrum:

- Thalictrum minus L. indigenous
- Thalictrum rhynchocarpum Quart.-Dill. & A.Rich. indigenous
