= Mousetail =

Mousetail is used as a common name for species of plants in several genera:

- Ivesia in the rose family
- Myosurus in the buttercup family

- Myosurus apetalus, bristly mousetail, native to western North and South America
- Myosurus cupulatus, Arizona mousetail, native to the south-western United States and northern Mexico
- Myosurus minimus, tiny mousetail, native to much of the Northern Hemisphere
- Myosurus sessilis, vernal pool mousetail, native to southern Oregon and central California in the United States

- Rhipsalis baccifera, in particular R. baccifera subsp. horrida (syn. R. horrida), mouse tail or mouse tail cactus
