= Knowltonia =

Knowltonia may refer to:

- Knowltonia (beetle), a genus of beetle in the family Buprestidae
- Knowltonia (plant), a genus of plant in the family Ranunculaceae
