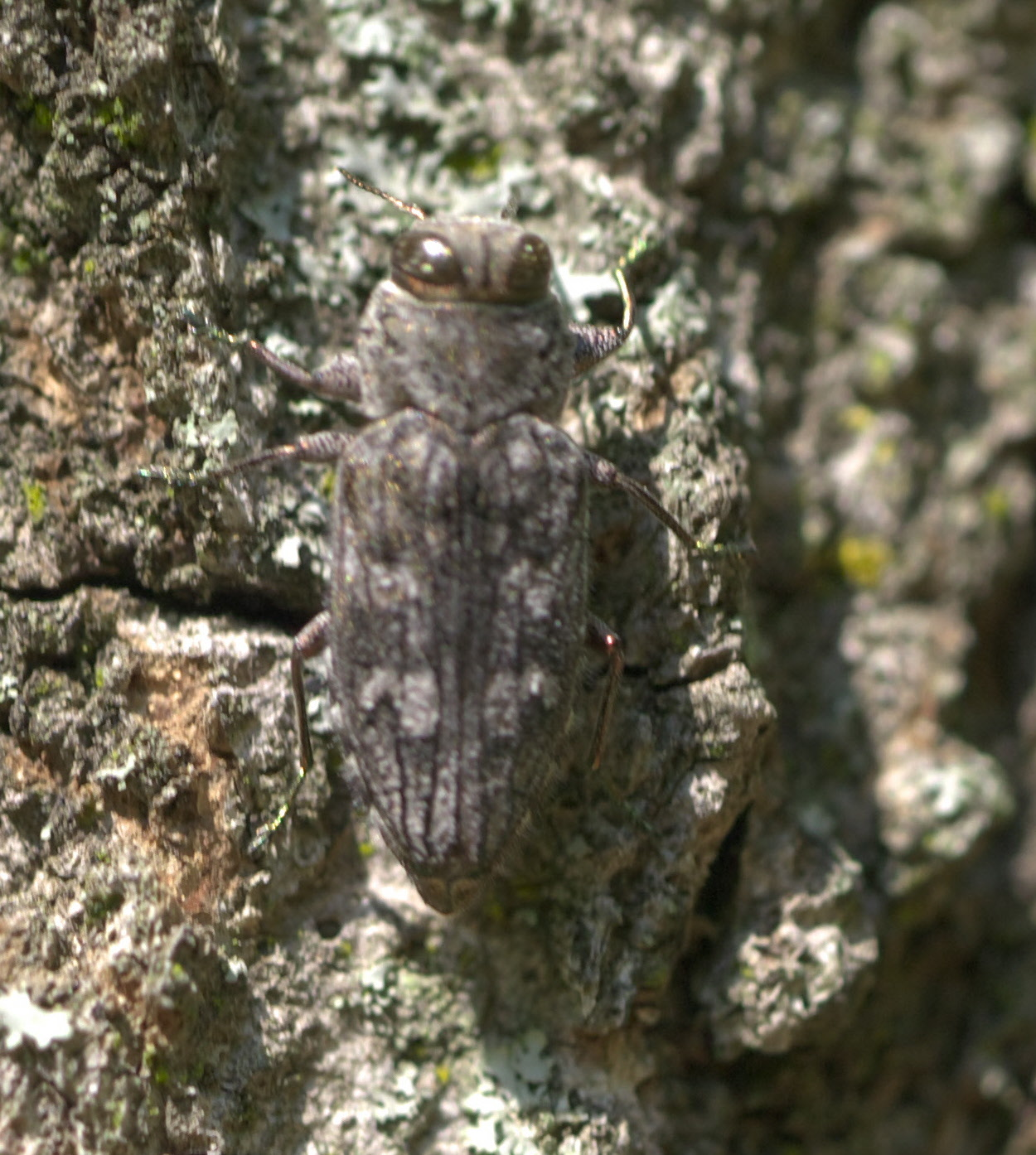

Scientific classification
- Kingdom: Animalia
- Phylum: Arthropoda
- Clade: Pancrustacea
- Class: Insecta
- Order: Coleoptera
- Suborder: Polyphaga
- Infraorder: Elateriformia
- Family: Buprestidae
- Subfamily: Buprestinae
- Tribe: Chrysobothrini
- Genus: Chrysobothris; Eschscholtz, 1829

Diversity
- at least 690 species

Synonyms
- Amblis Gistel, 1834; Ceratobothris Kirby, 1837; Enocys Gistel, 1856; Odontomus Pochon, 1972; Tamina Gistel, 1848

= Chrysobothris =

Genus of beetles

Chrysobothris is a genus of metallic wood-boring beetles in the family Buprestidae. There are at least 690 described species in Chrysobothris.

== See also ==
- List of Chrysobothris species
