= Knowltonia chilensis =

Scientific classification
- Kingdom: Plantae
- Clade: Embryophytes
- Clade: Tracheophytes
- Clade: Spermatophytes
- Clade: Angiosperms
- Clade: Eudicots
- Order: Ranunculales
- Family: Ranunculaceae
- Genus: Knowltonia
- Species: K. chilensis

Binomial name
- Knowltonia chilensis (Gay) Christenh. & Byng

Species of flowering plant

Knowltonia chilensis is a species of flowering plant in the family Ranunculaceae. It is native to Central Chile and Argentina. It is one of the six Knowltonia species native to Chile alongside Knowltonia balliana, Knowltonia hepaticifolia, Knowltonia hootae, Knowltonia major, and Knowltonia moorei.
