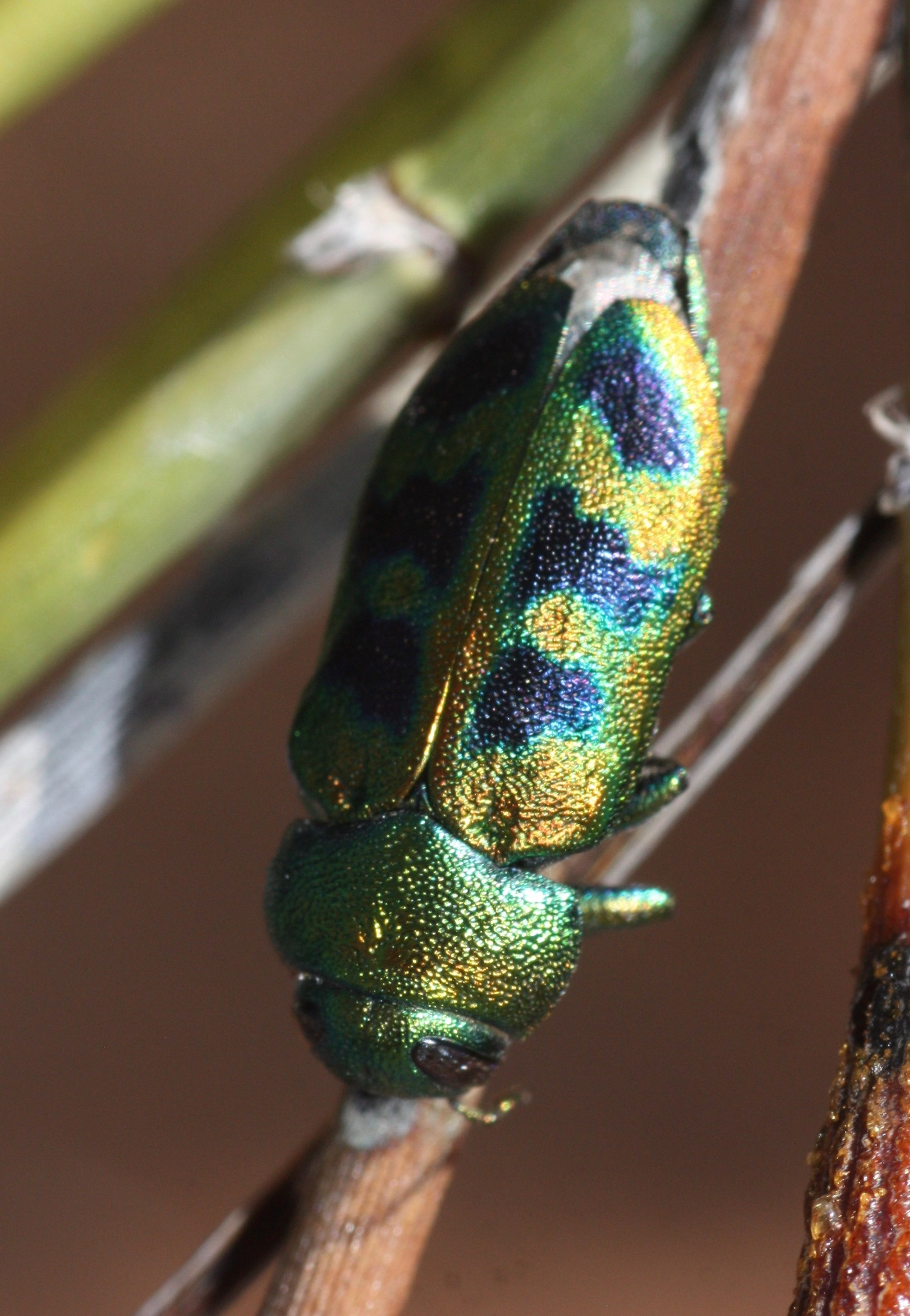

Scientific classification
- Kingdom: Animalia
- Phylum: Arthropoda
- Class: Insecta
- Order: Coleoptera
- Suborder: Polyphaga
- Infraorder: Elateriformia
- Family: Buprestidae
- Genus: Knowltonia
- Species: K. atrifasciata

Binomial name
- Knowltonia atrifasciata (LeConte, 1873)

= Knowltonia atrifasciata =

Species of beetle

Knowltonia atrifasciata is a species of metallic wood-boring beetle in the family Buprestidae. It is found in North America.
