= Sphaerobothris ulkei =

Scientific classification
- Domain: Eukaryota
- Kingdom: Animalia
- Phylum: Arthropoda
- Class: Insecta
- Order: Coleoptera
- Suborder: Polyphaga
- Infraorder: Elateriformia
- Family: Buprestidae
- Genus: Sphaerobothris
- Species: S. ulkei

Binomial name
- Sphaerobothris ulkei (LeConte, 1860)

Species of beetle

Sphaerobothris ulkei is a species of metallic wood-boring beetle in the family Buprestidae. It is found in Central America and North America.
