= Sphaerobothris platti =

Scientific classification
- Kingdom: Animalia
- Phylum: Arthropoda
- Class: Insecta
- Order: Coleoptera
- Suborder: Polyphaga
- Infraorder: Elateriformia
- Family: Buprestidae
- Genus: Sphaerobothris
- Species: S. platti

Binomial name
- Sphaerobothris platti (Cazier, 1938)

Synonyms
- Sphaerobothris santarosae (Knull, 1947)

Species of beetle

Sphaerobothris platti is a species of metallic wood-boring beetle in the family Buprestidae. It is found in North America.
