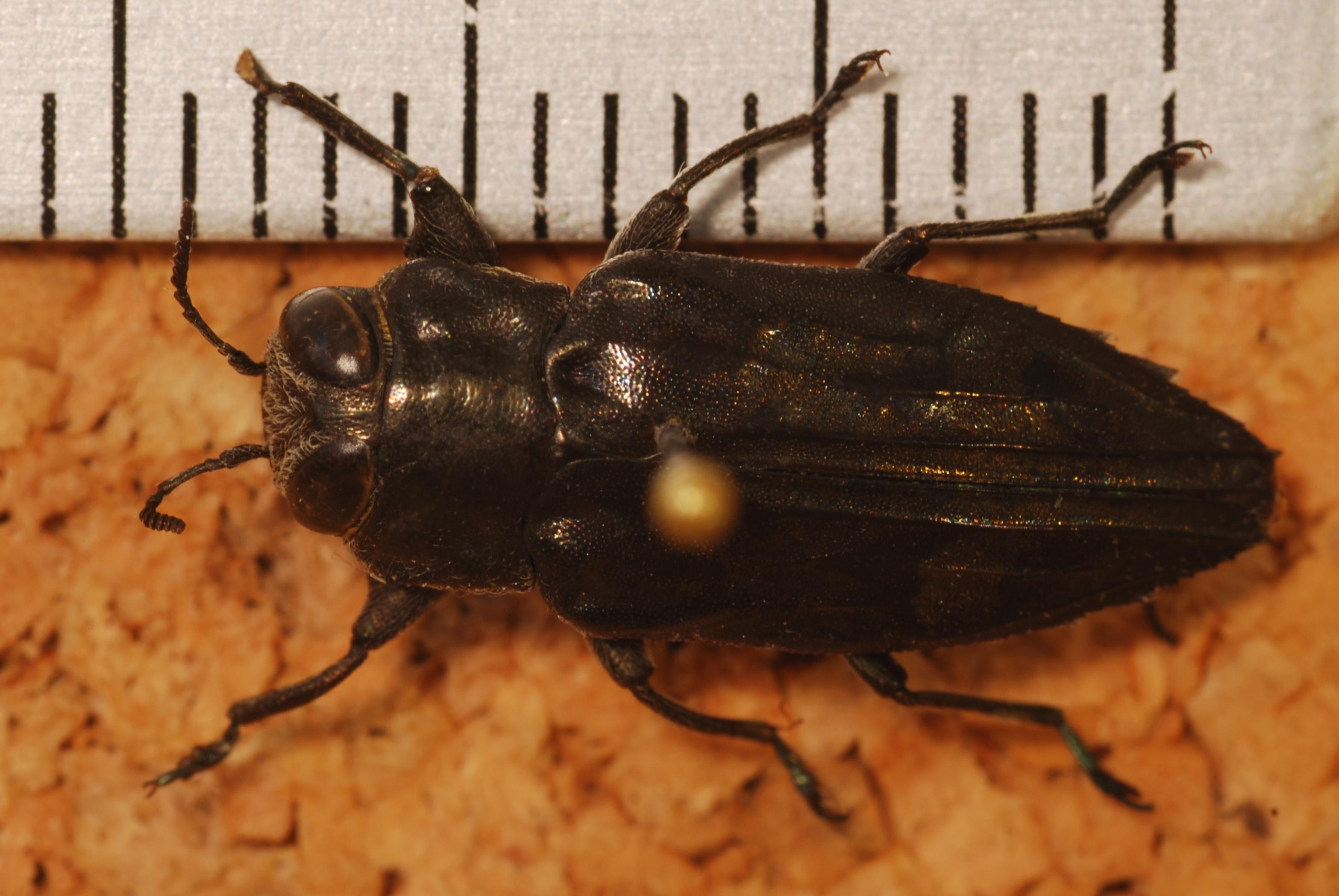
- Chrysobothris acutipennis

Scientific classification
- Kingdom: Animalia
- Phylum: Arthropoda
- Clade: Pancrustacea
- Class: Insecta
- Order: Coleoptera
- Suborder: Polyphaga
- Infraorder: Elateriformia
- Family: Buprestidae
- Subfamily: Buprestinae
- Tribe: Chrysobothrini; Gory & Laporte, 1838

= Chrysobothrini =

Tribe of beetles

Chrysobothrini is a tribe of metallic wood-boring beetles in the family Buprestidae. There are at least 3 genera and 140 described species in Chrysobothrini.

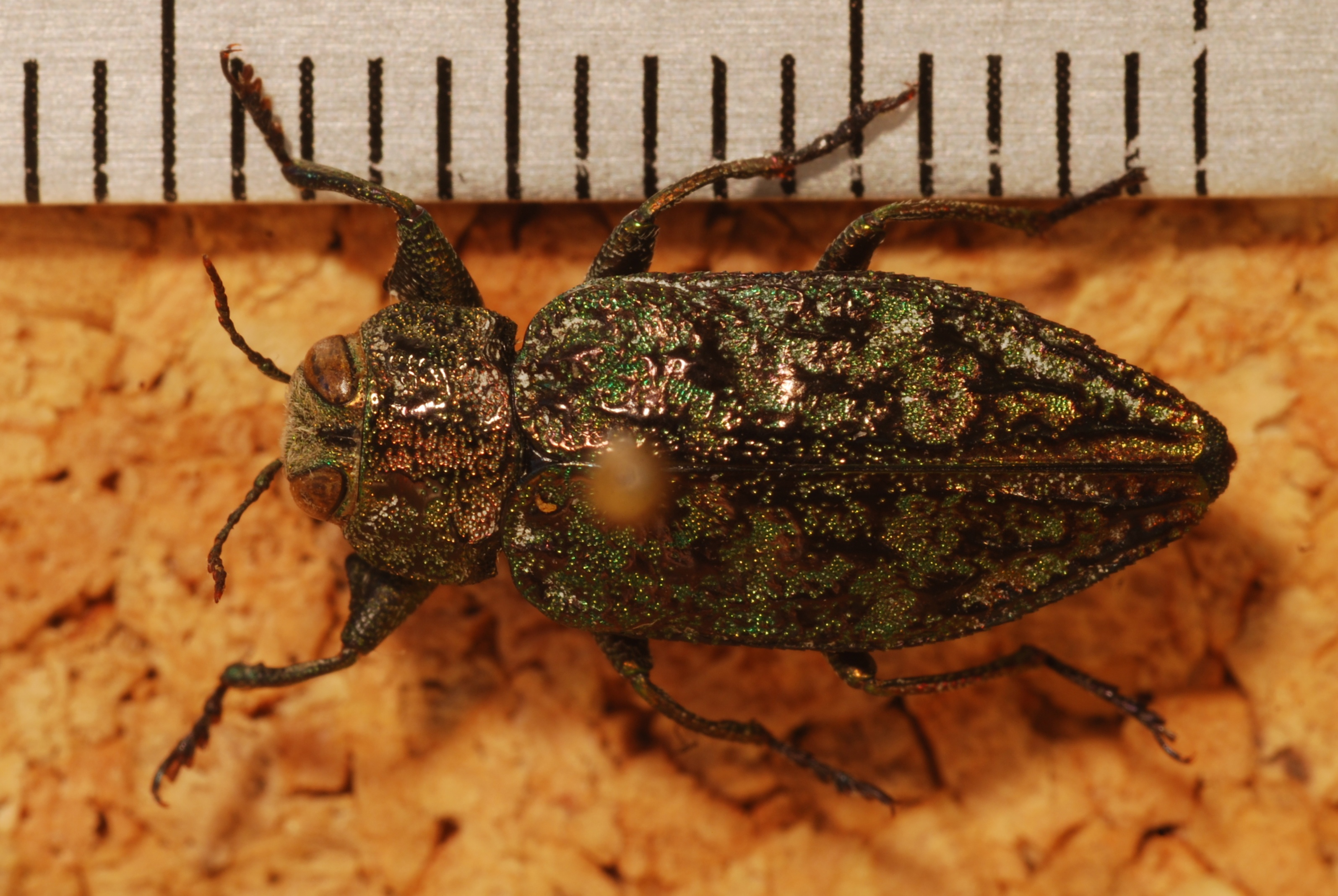
Chrysobothris verdigripennis

== Genera ==
- Chrysobothris Eschscholtz, 1829
- Knowltonia Fisher, 1935
- Sphaerobothris Semenov-Tian-Shanskij & Richter, 1934
