= Sphaerobothris =

Scientific classification
- Kingdom: Animalia
- Phylum: Arthropoda
- Class: Insecta
- Order: Coleoptera
- Suborder: Polyphaga
- Infraorder: Elateriformia
- Family: Buprestidae
- Tribe: Chrysobothrini
- Genus: Sphaerobothris; Semenov & Richter 1934

Genus of beetles

Sphaerobothris is a genus of beetles in the family Buprestidae subfamily Buprestinae, and Tribe Chrysobothrini containing the following species:

- Sphaerobothris aghababiani Volkovitsh & Kalashian, 1998
- Sphaerobothris dinauxi (Thery, 1935)
- Sphaerobothris globicollis (Reitter, 1895)
- Sphaerobothris platti (Cazier, 1938)
- Sphaerobothris ulkei (LeConte, 1860)
