= Myosurus cupulatus =

Scientific classification
- Kingdom: Plantae
- Clade: Embryophytes
- Clade: Tracheophytes
- Clade: Spermatophytes
- Clade: Angiosperms
- Clade: Eudicots
- Order: Ranunculales
- Family: Ranunculaceae
- Genus: Myosurus
- Species: M. cupulatus

Binomial name
- Myosurus cupulatus S.Watson

Species of flowering plant

Myosurus cupulatus is a species of flowering plant in the family Ranunculaceae known by the common name Arizona mousetail. It is native to the southwestern United States and northern Mexico, where it grows in moist and dry habitat types in desert, scrub, and woodland. It is an annual plant forming a small tuft up to about 14 centimeters tall. The leaves are linear to lance-shaped and up to 7 centimeters in length. The inflorescence produces a single flower which has an elongated, cylindrical or cone-shaped receptacle up to 4 centimeters long. At the base of the receptacle are curving, spurred sepals and five petals each under 3 millimeters long.
