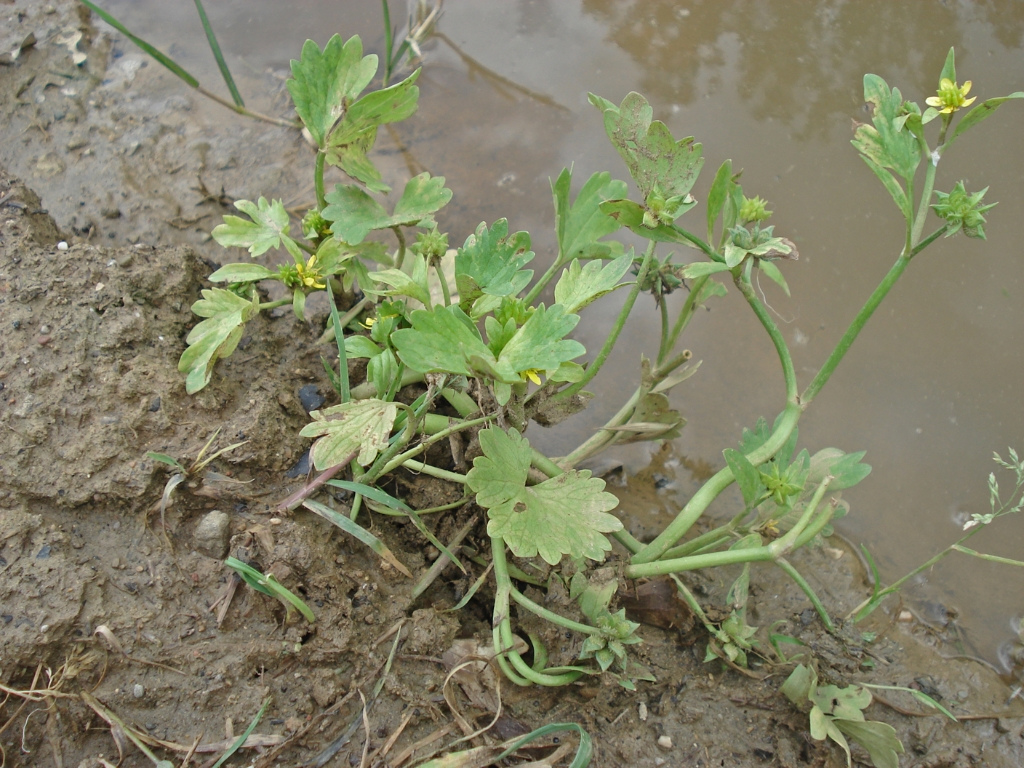

Scientific classification
- Kingdom: Plantae
- Clade: Tracheophytes
- Clade: Angiosperms
- Clade: Eudicots
- Order: Ranunculales
- Family: Ranunculaceae
- Genus: Ranunculus
- Species: R. muricatus

Binomial name
- Ranunculus muricatus L.

= Ranunculus muricatus =

Species of buttercup

Ranunculus muricatus is a species of buttercup known by the common names rough-fruited buttercup and spinyfruit buttercup. It is native to Europe, but it can be found in many other places in the world, including parts of Africa, Australia, and the western and eastern United States, as an introduced species and agricultural and roadside weed. It grows in wet habitats, such as irrigation ditches. It is an annual or sometimes biennial herb producing a mostly hairless stem up to half a meter long which may grow erect or decumbent along the ground. The leaves have blades a few centimetres in length which are deeply divided into three lobes or split into three leaflets. They are hairless to hairy in texture, and are borne at the tips of long petioles. The flower has five shiny yellow petals under 1 centimetre (0.4 in) long around a lobed central receptacle studded with many stamens and pistils. The fruit is a spiny achene borne in a spherical cluster of 10 to 20.
