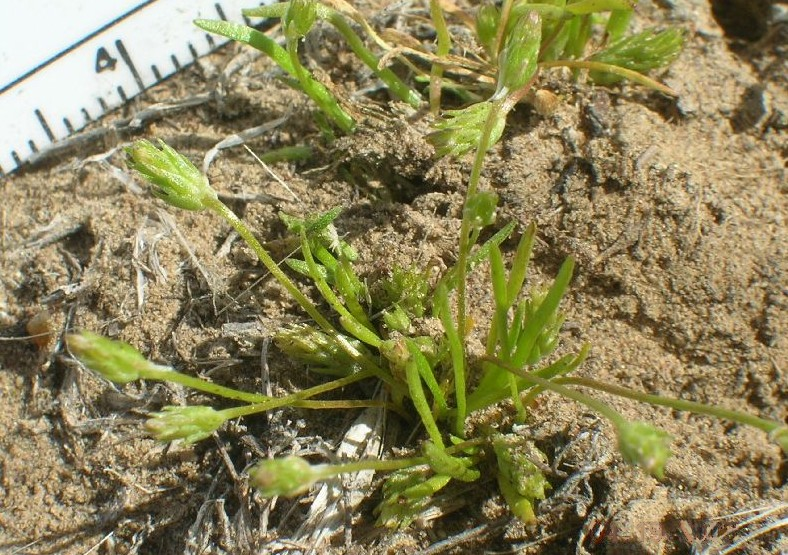

Scientific classification
- Kingdom: Plantae
- Clade: Tracheophytes
- Clade: Angiosperms
- Clade: Eudicots
- Order: Ranunculales
- Family: Ranunculaceae
- Genus: Myosurus
- Species: M. apetalus

Binomial name
- Myosurus apetalus C.Gay

= Myosurus apetalus =

Species of flowering plant

Myosurus apetalus is a species of flowering plant in the family Ranunculaceae known by the common name bristly mousetail. It is native to much of western North America, as well as Chile. It grows in moist and wet habitat, such as marshes, meadows, and vernal pools. It is an annual plant forming a small tuft up to about 12 centimeters tall. The leaves are linear and narrow, sometimes threadlike, and reach up to 6 centimeters in length. The inflorescence produces a single flower which has an elongated, cylindrical or cone-shaped receptacle up to 1.5 centimeters long. At the base of the receptacle are small greenish sepals and sometimes petals 1 or 2 millimeters long, although the petals are often absent.
