= Ranunculus multifidus =

Scientific classification
- Kingdom: Plantae
- Clade: Tracheophytes
- Clade: Angiosperms
- Clade: Eudicots
- Order: Ranunculales
- Family: Ranunculaceae
- Genus: Ranunculus
- Species: R. multifidus

Binomial name
- Ranunculus multifidus Forssk.

Synonyms
- List: Ranunculus capensis Thunb.; Ranunculus forskoehlii DC.; Ranunculus madagascariensis Freyn; Ranunculus membranaceus Fresen.; Ranunculus pinnatus Poir.; Ranunculus pubescens Thunb.; Ranunculus rutenbergii Freyn; Ranunculus udus Freyn; Stylurus fistulosus Raf.

Species of flowering plant

Ranunculus multifidus, called the common buttercup in South Africa, is a widespread species of flowering plant in the family Ranunculaceae. It is native to Sub‑Saharan Africa (except West Africa), Madagascar, and the Arabian Peninsula. It grows in wet areas. It is used in traditional medicine to treat sores and toothaches.
