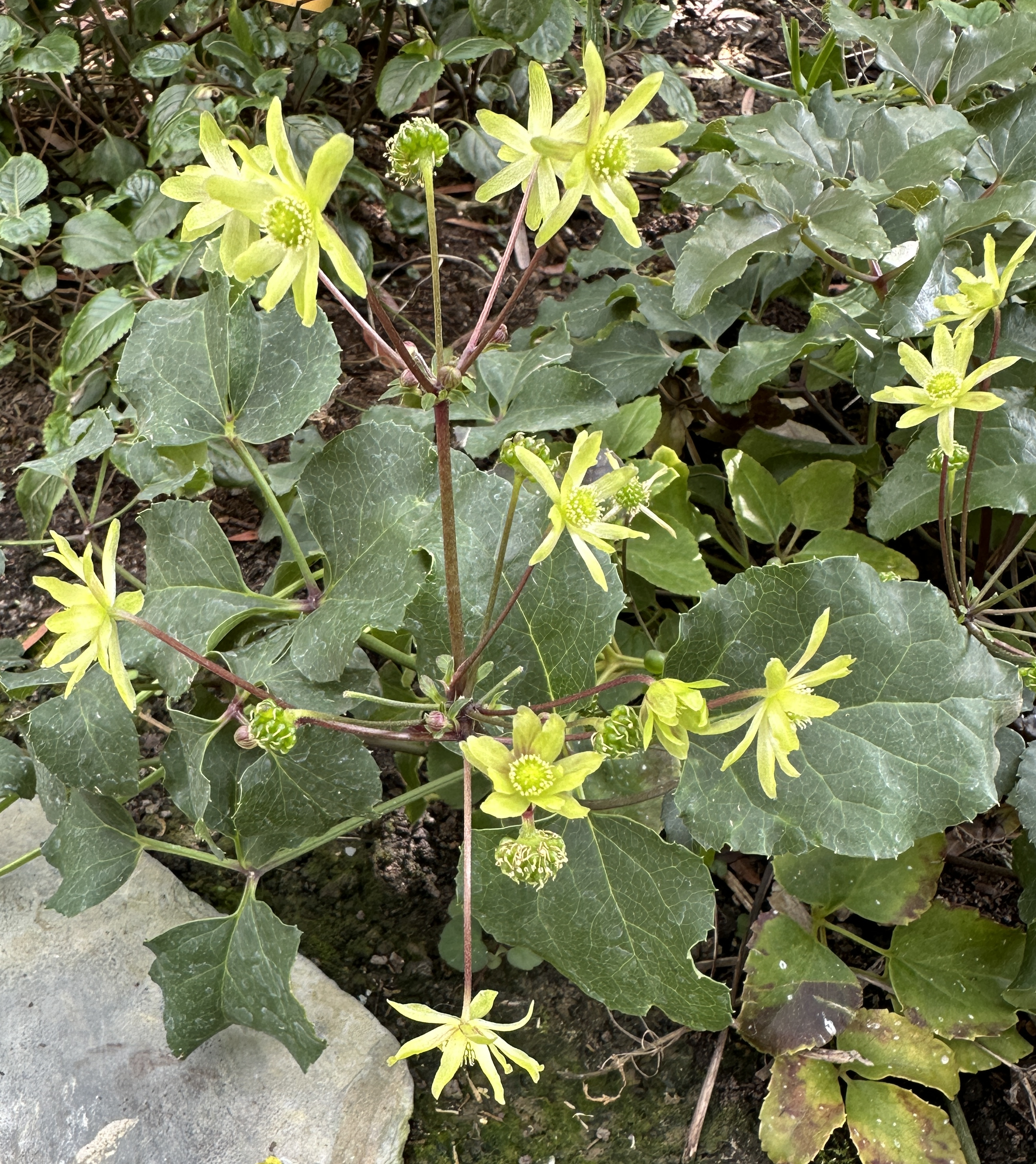

Scientific classification
- Kingdom: Plantae
- Clade: Tracheophytes
- Clade: Angiosperms
- Clade: Eudicots
- Order: Ranunculales
- Family: Ranunculaceae
- Genus: Knowltonia
- Species: K. capensis

Binomial name
- Knowltonia capensis (L.) Huth

Synonyms
- Anemone knowltonia Burtt Davy

= Knowltonia capensis =

Species of flowering plant

Knowltonia capensis (Brandblare) is an attractive, shade-loving plant of the family Ranunculaceae, that is indigenous to the Cape and Kwazulu-Natal regions of South Africa.

The centre of this plant's natural distribution is the Eastern Cape, where it is also most common. However, it can be found to the east in Natal, and as far west as Cape Town, where the plant's western relative Knowltonia vesicatoria is more common. Throughout this area, it grows under trees and in other shady spots, especially in dense afro-montane forest.

Like its close relative, Knowltonia vesicatoria, this plant is also ideal for ornamental cultivation in shady gardens. It is tough and attractive, and does well in dense clumps or growing around the base of a tree. It can easily be propagated from seed, and larger plants can be sub-divided.
