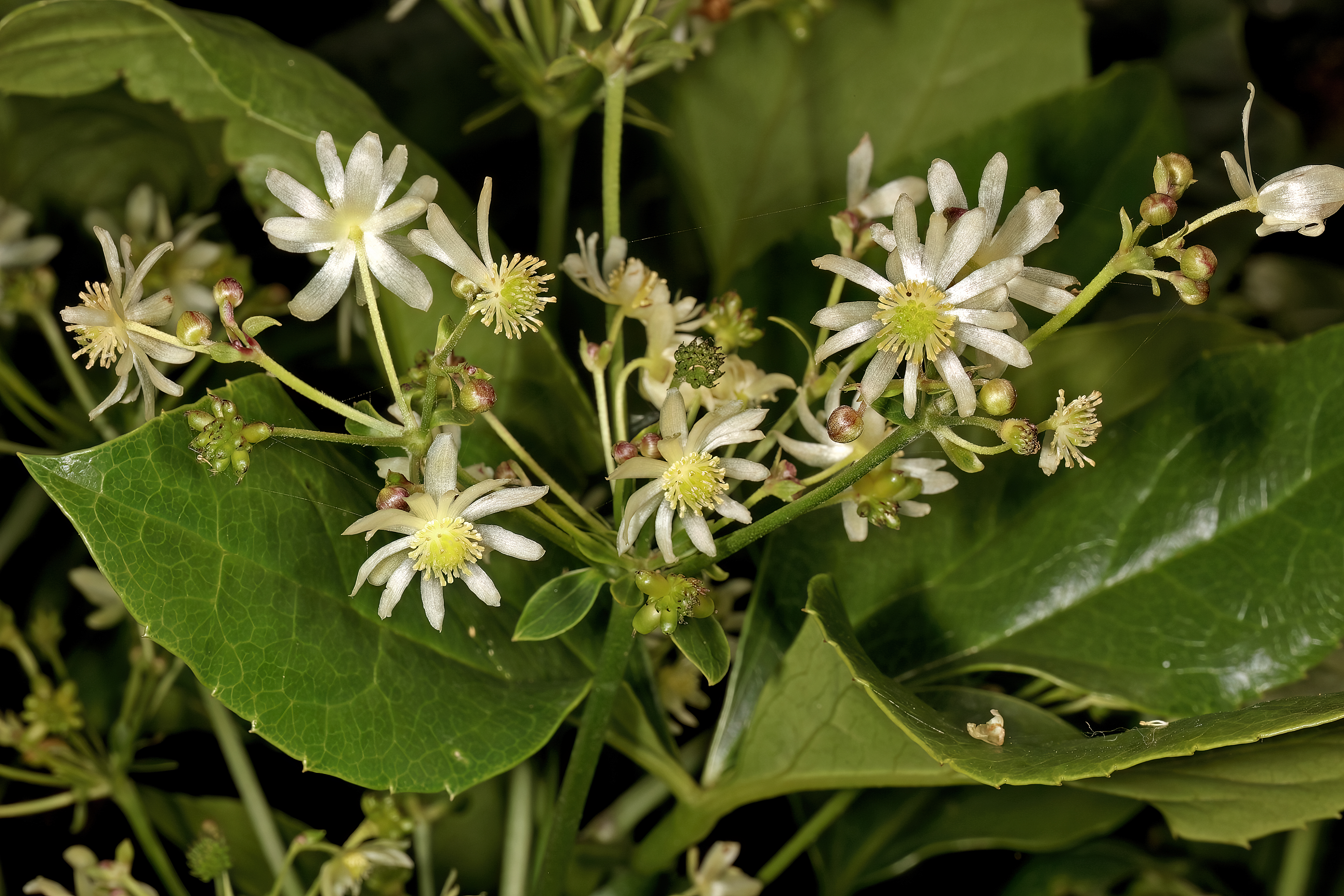
- Knowltonia vesicatoria leaf and flowers.

Scientific classification
- Kingdom: Plantae
- Clade: Embryophytes
- Clade: Tracheophytes
- Clade: Spermatophytes
- Clade: Angiosperms
- Clade: Eudicots
- Order: Ranunculales
- Family: Ranunculaceae
- Genus: Knowltonia
- Species: K. vesicatoria

Binomial name
- Knowltonia vesicatoria (L.f.) Sims

Synonyms
- Anemone vesicatoria

= Knowltonia vesicatoria =

Species of flowering plant

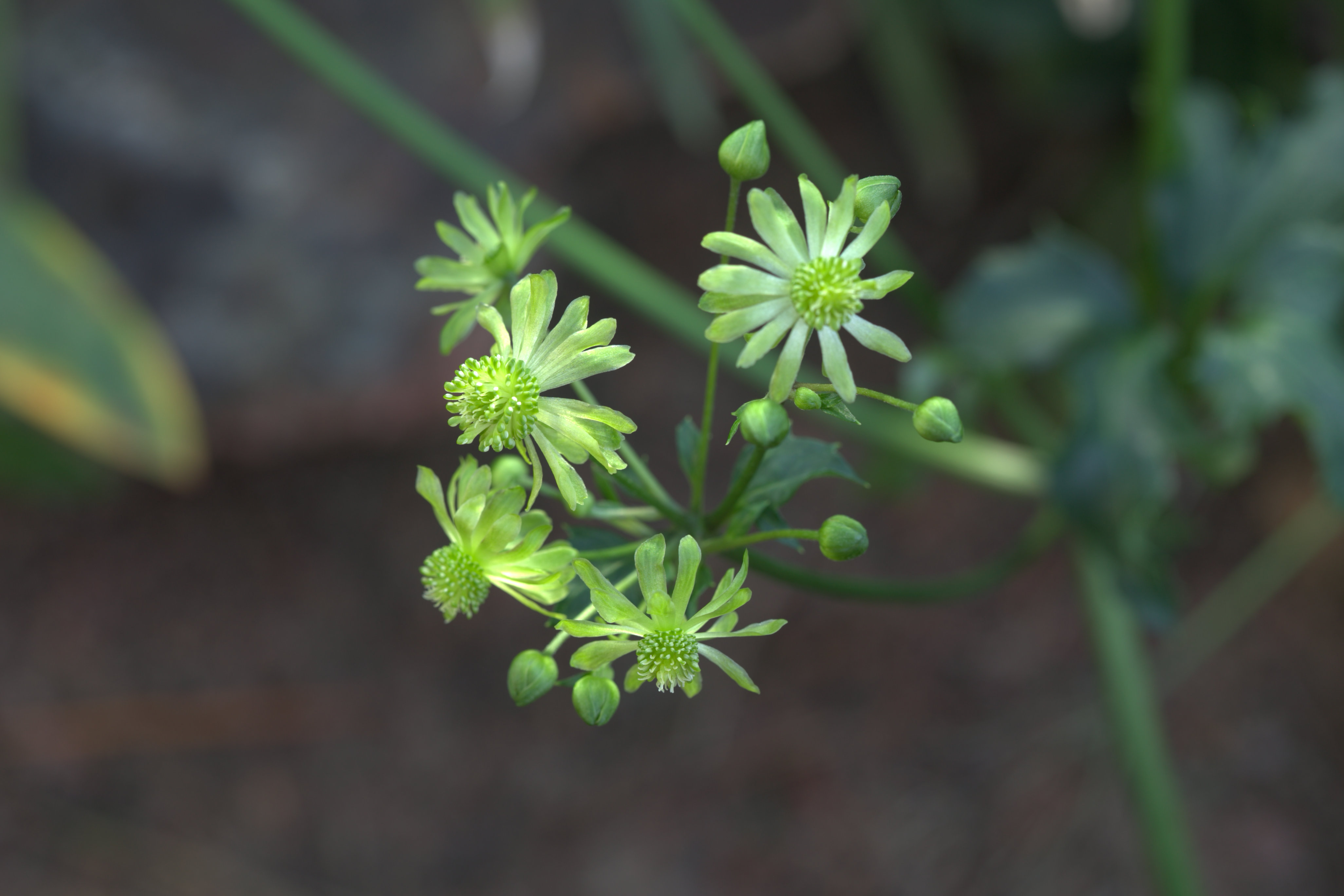

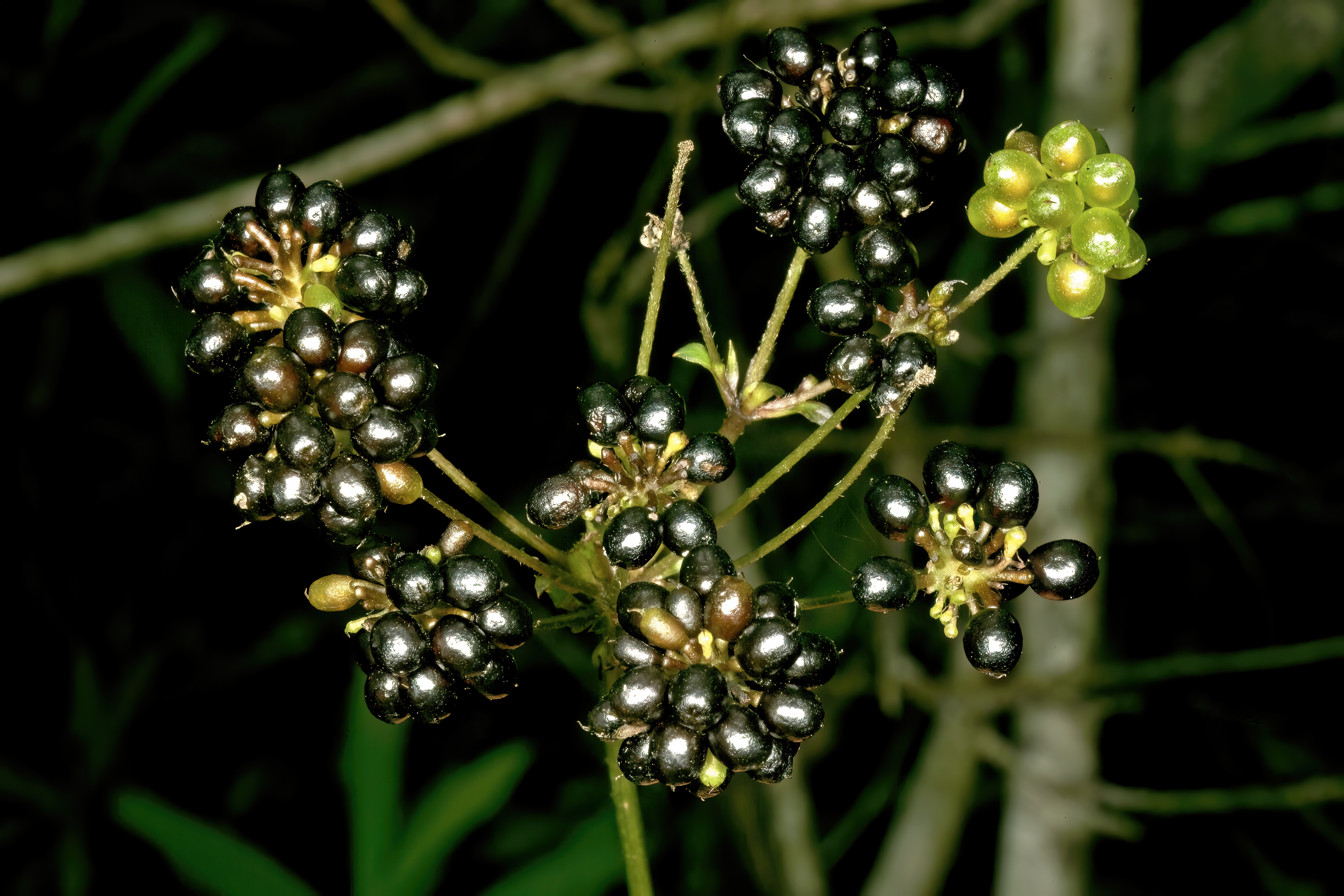

Knowltonia vesicatoria (Brandblaar) is an attractive, shade-loving plant of the family Ranunculaceae, that is indigenous to the southern parts of South Africa.

This is one of at least ten species of Knowltonia that are native to South Africa. Knowltonia vesicatoria can be told apart from the other species by its leaves and stems being hairless, and by the slightly jagged, toothed margins of the leaves. It in turn has three subspecies: vesicatoria, humilis and grossa.

This slow-growing plant forms clusters of dark green leaves on the forest floors where it grows. It produces white or yellow flowers in spring and then clusters of fleshy black fruits. A tough and adaptable plant that easily survives seasonal fires, Brandblaar grows in shady spots in Cape Fynbos, along the coast, in afro-montane forest and just about anywhere else - throughout the Cape Floristic Region, from Cape Town eastwards as far as Grahamstown.

Further east - in the Eastern Cape and Kwazulu-Natal - this plant's close relative Knowltonia capensis is rather more common.

This is an ideal plant for shady spots in gardens. It grows very slowly but once established it is tough and attractive, and survives deep shade where other plants would die. It grows much faster if it is watered regularly, and should be allowed to establish itself, free from competition from faster-growing groundcovers. It can easily be propagated by seed.
