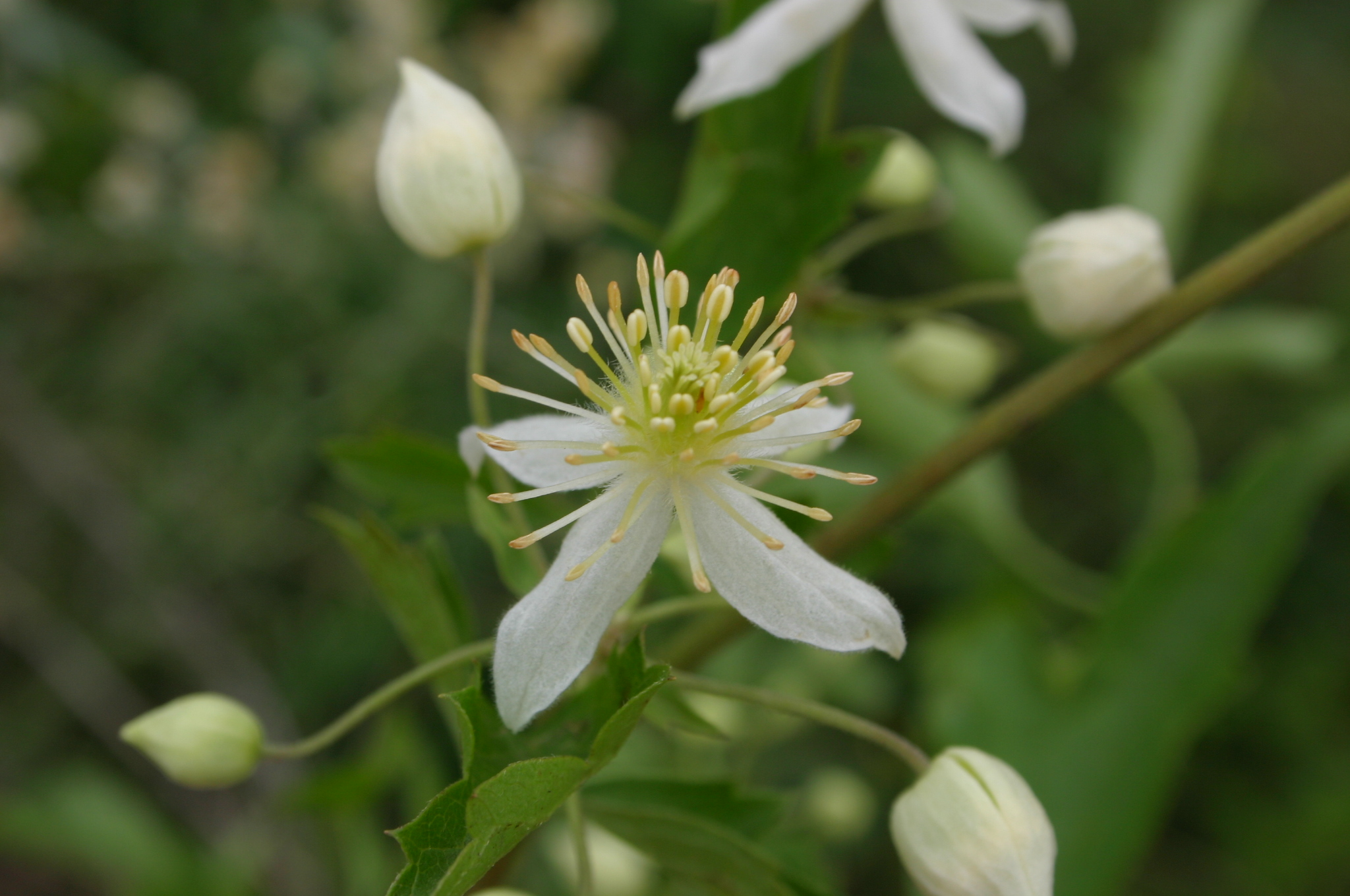
- Flower and flowerbuds
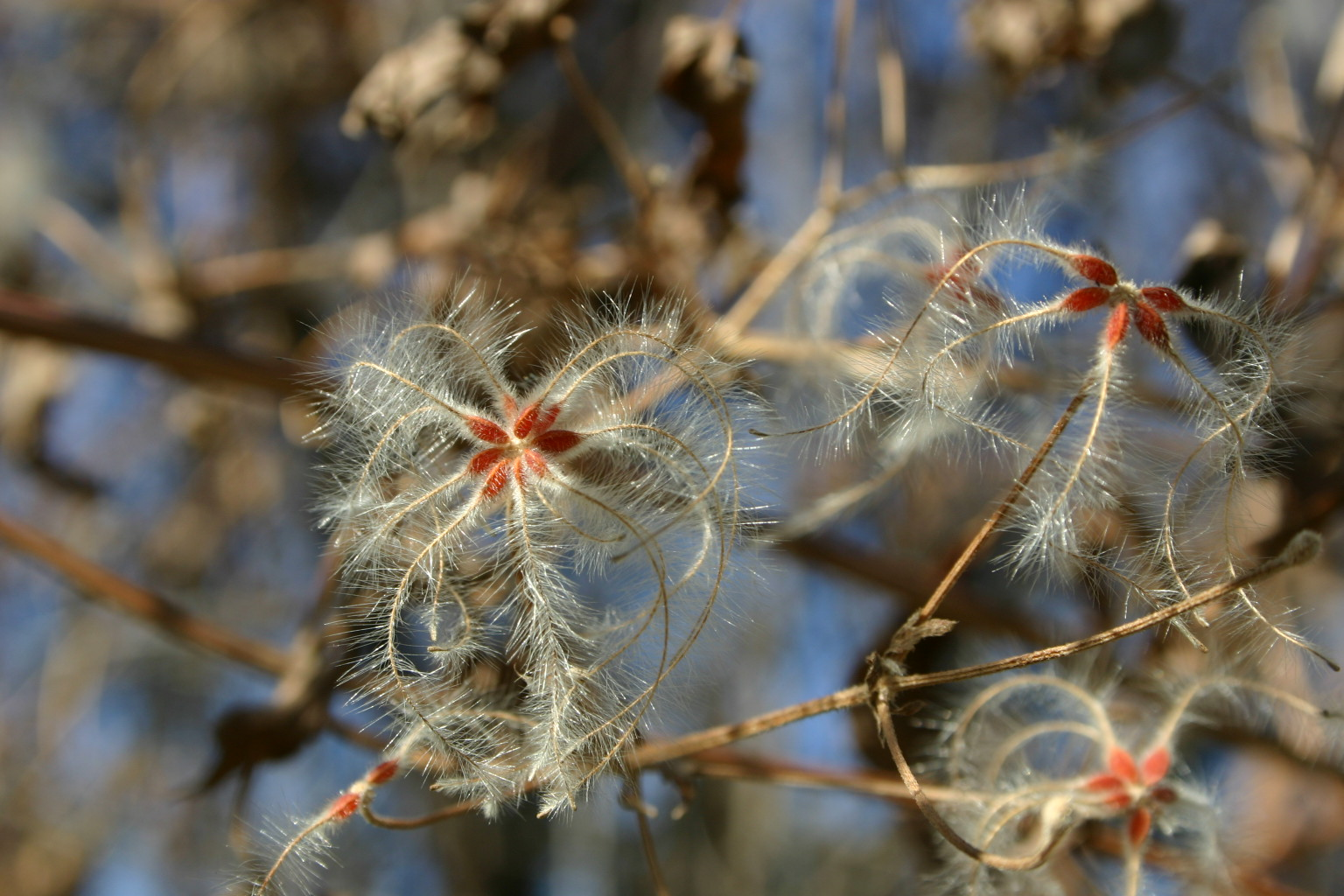
- Fruits

Scientific classification
- Kingdom: Plantae
- Clade: Tracheophytes
- Clade: Angiosperms
- Clade: Eudicots
- Order: Ranunculales
- Family: Ranunculaceae
- Genus: Clematis
- Species: C. brachiata

Binomial name
- Clematis brachiata Thunb.

= Clematis brachiata =

Species of flowering plant in the buttercup family

Clematis brachiata, commonly known as traveller's joy, is a hardy, deciduous Southern African liana of the family Ranunculaceae.

It tends to clamber to the tops of trees and shrubs, sprawling over the crowns. Leaves are compound with from 1 to 7 leaflets. Attractive, highly fragrant flowers appear in summer. Achenes are covered in fine silky hair.

This species is common in the northern parts of South Africa and kwaZulu-Natal and was first described by Carl Peter Thunberg (1743-1828), the celebrated Swedish naturalist.

"Clema" is Greek for a liane, and the Latin specific name "brachiata" means "provided with arms" since the right-angled and opposite branching habit resembles arms sticking out of a torso.

== See also ==
- List of Southern African indigenous trees

== Gallery ==
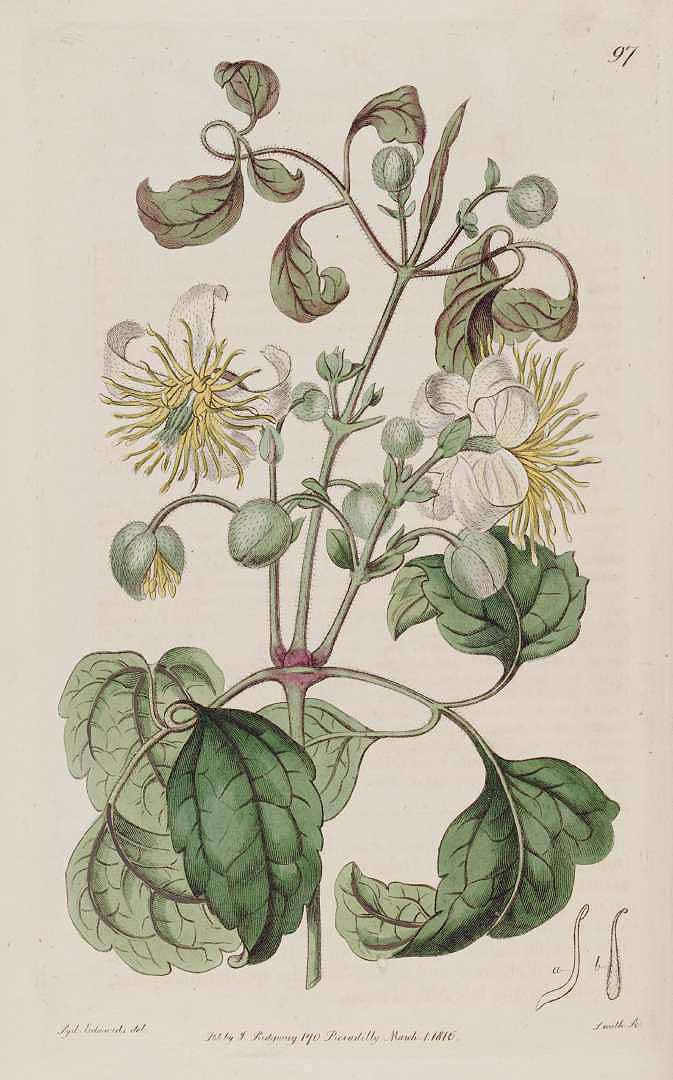

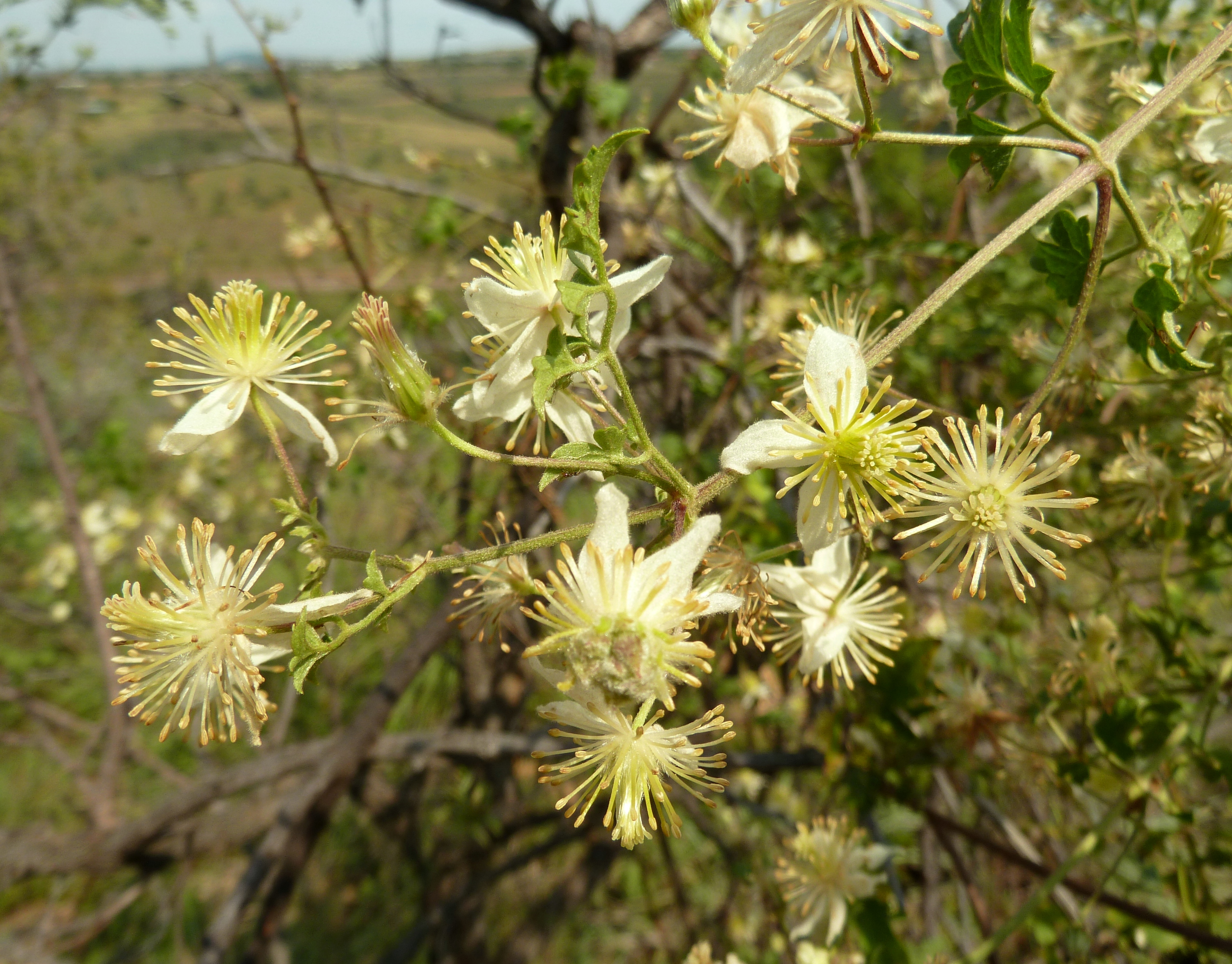
