= Myosurus sessilis =

Conservation status
- Imperiled (NatureServe)

Scientific classification
- Kingdom: Plantae
- Clade: Tracheophytes
- Clade: Angiosperms
- Clade: Eudicots
- Order: Ranunculales
- Family: Ranunculaceae
- Genus: Myosurus
- Species: M. sessilis

Binomial name
- Myosurus sessilis S.Watson

Species of flowering plant

Myosurus sessilis is a species of flowering plant in the buttercup family known by the common name vernal pool mousetail. It is native to southern Oregon and the Central Valley of California, where it grows in vernal pools and other wet grassland habitat. It is an annual plant forming a small tuft up to about 10 centimeters tall. The leaves are narrow and linear in shape, measuring up to 7 centimeters in length. The inflorescence produces a single flower which has an elongated, cylindrical or cone-shaped receptacle up to 3 centimeters long. At the base of the receptacle are curving, spurred sepals and three to five tiny petals.
