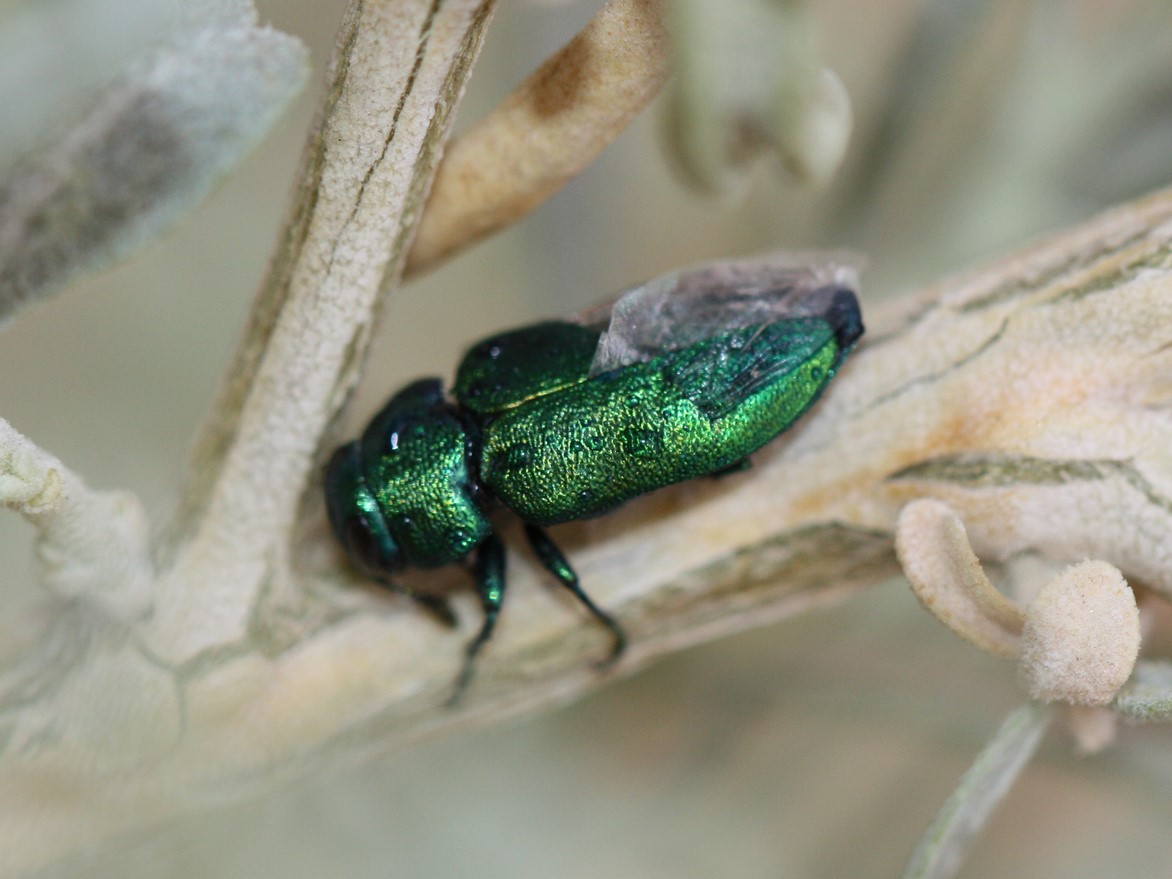
- Knowltonia alleni

Scientific classification
- Kingdom: Animalia
- Phylum: Arthropoda
- Class: Insecta
- Order: Coleoptera
- Suborder: Polyphaga
- Infraorder: Elateriformia
- Family: Buprestidae
- Tribe: Chrysobothrini
- Genus: Knowltonia; Fisher, 1935

= Knowltonia (beetle) =

Genus of beetles

Knowltonia is a genus of beetles in the family Buprestidae, containing the following species:

- Knowltonia alleni (Cazier, 1938)
- Knowltonia atrifasciata (LeConte, 1873)
- Knowltonia biramosa Fisher, 1935
- Knowltonia calida (Knull, 1958)
