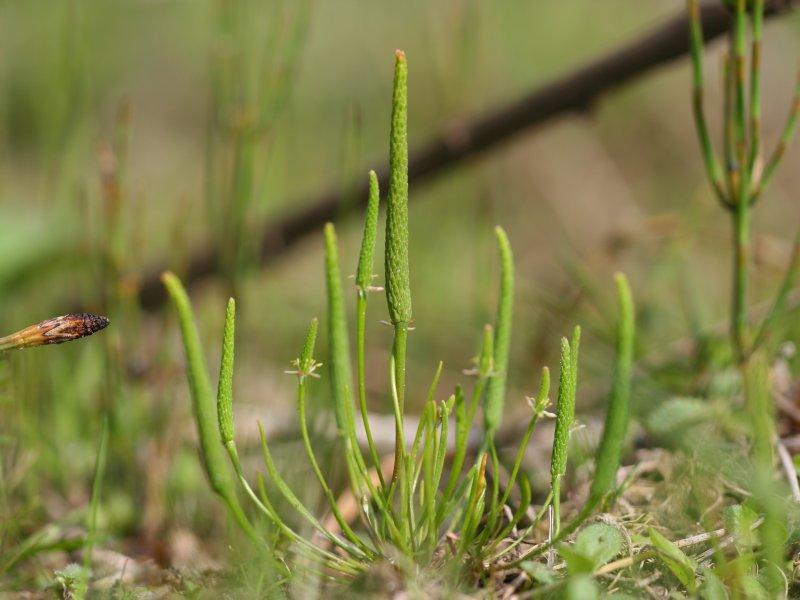

Scientific classification
- Kingdom: Plantae
- Clade: Tracheophytes
- Clade: Angiosperms
- Clade: Eudicots
- Order: Ranunculales
- Family: Ranunculaceae
- Genus: Myosurus
- Species: M. minimus

Binomial name
- Myosurus minimus L.

= Myosurus minimus =

Species of flowering plant

Myosurus minimus is a species of flowering plant in the family Ranunculaceae known by the common name tiny mousetail or just mousetail. It is native to much of the Northern Hemisphere, including parts of Europe, Asia, North Africa, and North America. It generally grows in moist habitat types, such as riverbanks and wet meadows.

It is an annual plant forming a small tuft up to about 12 cm (5 in) tall. The leaves are linear and narrow, sometimes threadlike, and up to 6 cm (2.4 in) in length. The inflorescence produces a single flower which has an elongated, cylindrical or cone-shaped receptacle up to 4 cm (1.6 in) long. At the base of the receptacle are curving, spurred sepals, five petals up to 3 mm (0 in) long, and ten stamens.
