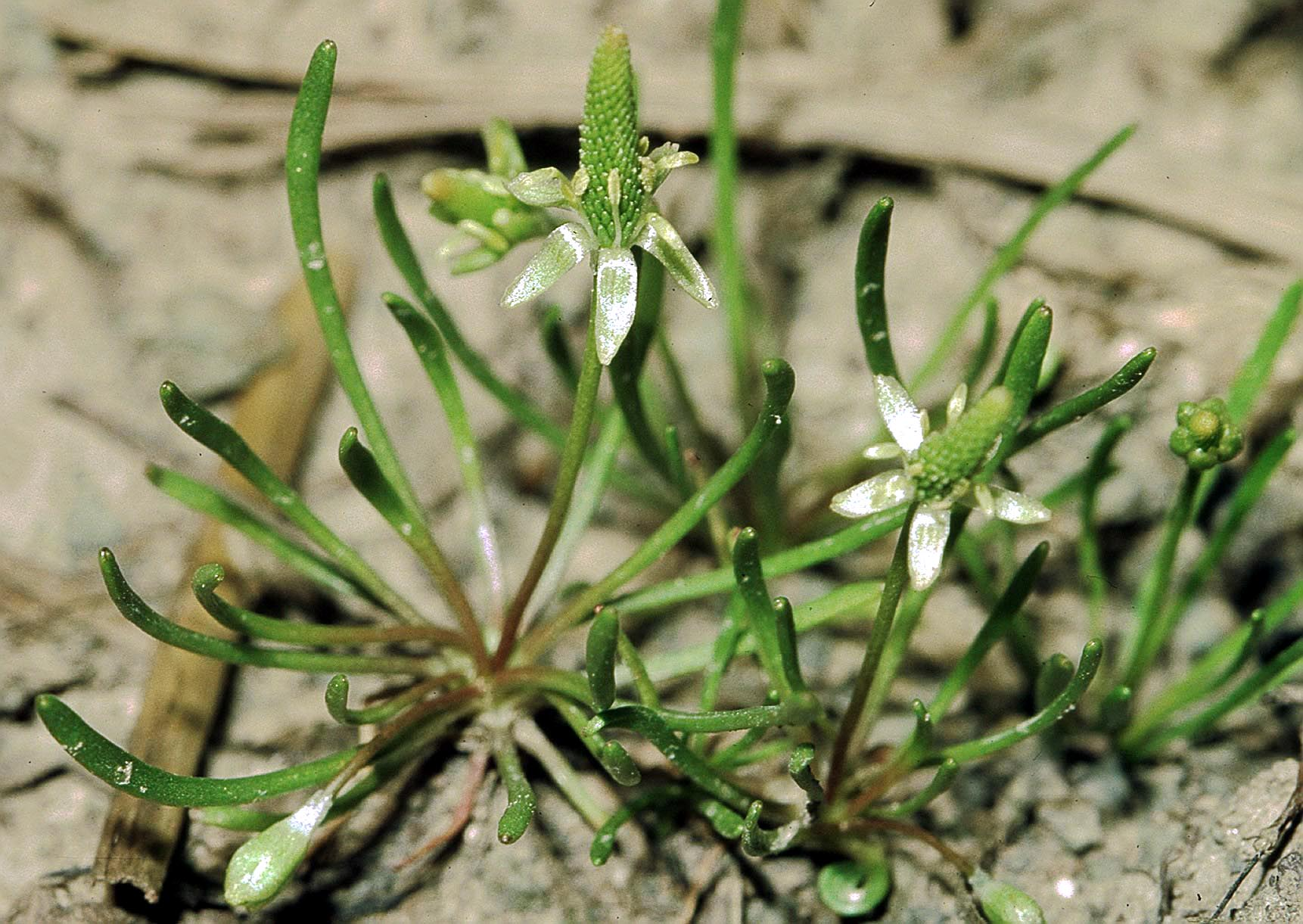
- Myosurus minimus

Scientific classification
- Kingdom: Plantae
- Clade: Tracheophytes
- Clade: Angiosperms
- Clade: Eudicots
- Order: Ranunculales
- Family: Ranunculaceae
- Subfamily: Ranunculoideae
- Tribe: Ranunculeae
- Genus: Myosurus; L.

= Myosurus =

Genus of flowering plants

The genus Myosurus, or mousetail, belongs to the family Ranunculaceae. It comprises about 15 species of annual scapose herbs. These herbs are nearly cosmopolitan (lacking in eastern Asia and tropical regions), with a center of diversity in western North America. The flowers are easily recognised by bearing 6 stamens with numerous ovaries on a stalk (accounting for the name "mousetail").

Selected species:

- Myosurus apetalus - bristly mousetail
- Myosurus cupulatus - Arizona mousetail
- Myosurus minimus - tiny mousetail
- Myosurus nitidus - western mousetail
- Myosurus sessilis - vernal pool mousetail
