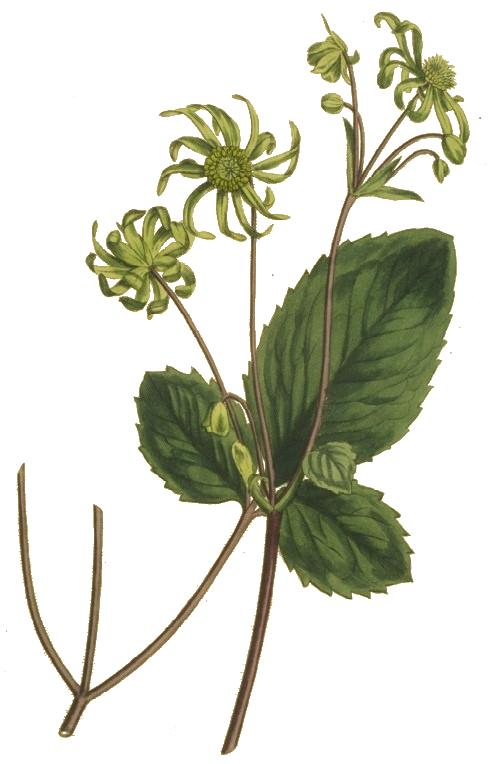
- Knowltonia vesicatoria

Scientific classification
- Kingdom: Plantae
- Clade: Tracheophytes
- Clade: Angiosperms
- Clade: Eudicots
- Order: Ranunculales
- Family: Ranunculaceae
- Subfamily: Ranunculoideae
- Tribe: Anemoneae
- Genus: Knowltonia; Salisb.

= Knowltonia (plant) =

Genus of flowering plants

Knowltonia is a genus of flowering plants in the family Ranunculaceae. There are 25 species native to South Africa and Latin America. The juice from the stem of many of the species in the genus is a powerful vesicant.

== Species include ==
Plants of the World Online accepts: the following species:

- Knowltonia anemonoides H.Rasm.
- Knowltonia assisbrasiliana (Kuhlm. & Porto) Christenh. & Byng
- Knowltonia balliana (Britton) Christenh. & Byng
- Knowltonia bracteata Harv. ex Zahlbr.
- Knowltonia brevistylis Szyszyl.
- Knowltonia caffra (Eckl. & Zeyh.) Christenh. & Byng ex Mosyakin & de Lange
- Knowltonia capensis (L.) Huth
- Knowltonia chilensis (Gay) Christenh. & Byng
- Knowltonia cordata H.Rasm.
- Knowltonia crassifolia (Hook.) Christenh. & Byng
- Knowltonia fanninii (Harv. ex Mast.) Christenh. & Byng
- Knowltonia filia (L.f.) T.Durand & Schinz
- Knowltonia helleborifolia (DC.) Christenh. & Byng
- Knowltonia hepaticifolia (Hook.) Christenh. & Byng
- Knowltonia hootae Christenh. & Byng
- Knowltonia integrifolia (DC.) Christenh. & Byng
- Knowltonia major (Phil.) Christenh. & Byng
- Knowltonia mexicana (Kunth) Christenh. & Byng
- Knowltonia moorei (Espinosa) Christenh. & Byng
- Knowltonia peruviana (Britton) Christenh. & Byng
- Knowltonia sellowii (Pritz.) Christenh. & Byng
- Knowltonia tenuifolia (L.f.) Mosyakin
- Knowltonia transvaalensis Szyszyl.
- Knowltonia vesicatoria (L.f.) Sims
- Knowltonia whyteana (Baker f.) Engl.
