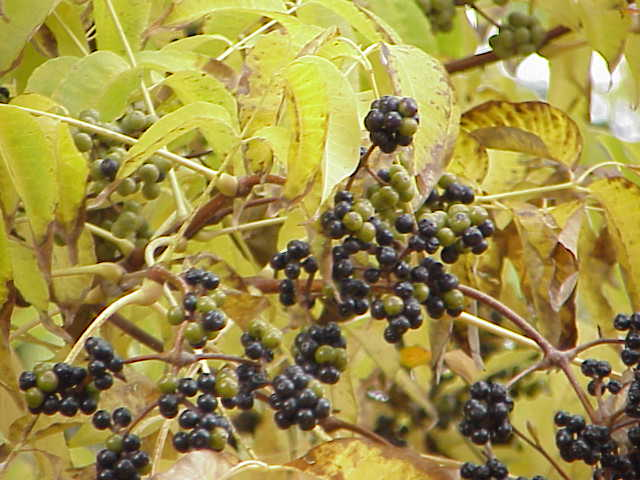
- Phellodendron amurense autumn leaves and fruit

Scientific classification
- Kingdom: Plantae
- Clade: Embryophytes
- Clade: Tracheophytes
- Clade: Angiosperms
- Clade: Eudicots
- Clade: Rosids
- Order: Sapindales
- Family: Rutaceae
- Subfamily: Zanthoxyloideae
- Genus: Phellodendron; Rupr.

Species
- Phellodendron amurense Rupr.; Phellodendron chinense C.K.Schneid.

= Phellodendron =

Genus of trees

Phellodendron, or cork-tree, is a genus of deciduous, dioecious trees in the family Rutaceae, native to east and northeast Asia. It has leathery, pinnate leaves and yellow, clumped flowers. The name refers to the thick and corky bark of some (but not all) species in the genus.

== Fossil record ==
Phellodendron seeds are known from the Early Oligocene of eastern North America, from the Mid Oligocene to the Pliocene of Europe and from the Pliocene of Asia and Japan.

One fossil seed of Phellodendron has been extracted from bore hole samples of the Middle Miocene fresh water deposits in Nowy Sacz Basin, West Carpathians, Poland. Several Phellodendron macrofossils have been recovered from the late Zanclean stage of Pliocene sites in Pocapaglia, Italy.

== Cultivation and uses ==
As an ornamental plant, Phellodendron is a tree for all seasons. In spring it has yellow flowers, in summer it provides foliage and shade, in fall the leaves turn bright yellow, and the textured bark and winding branches add interest in the winter. The female bears black drupes that attract birds and other wildlife through the late fall and winter.

The cork-tree is resistant to drought and insects, and it can thrive in a variety of soils. It is hardy to zone 4 and it is easy to maintain, sometimes to the point of being invasive. One drawback is that the drupes fall and scatter, which may be undesirable on a formal lawn.

The bark in some species is thick, resembling that of the cork oak, but is not thick enough for commercial cork production. It has been used to produce a yellow dye which is harmless to humans as well as being light and heat resistant.

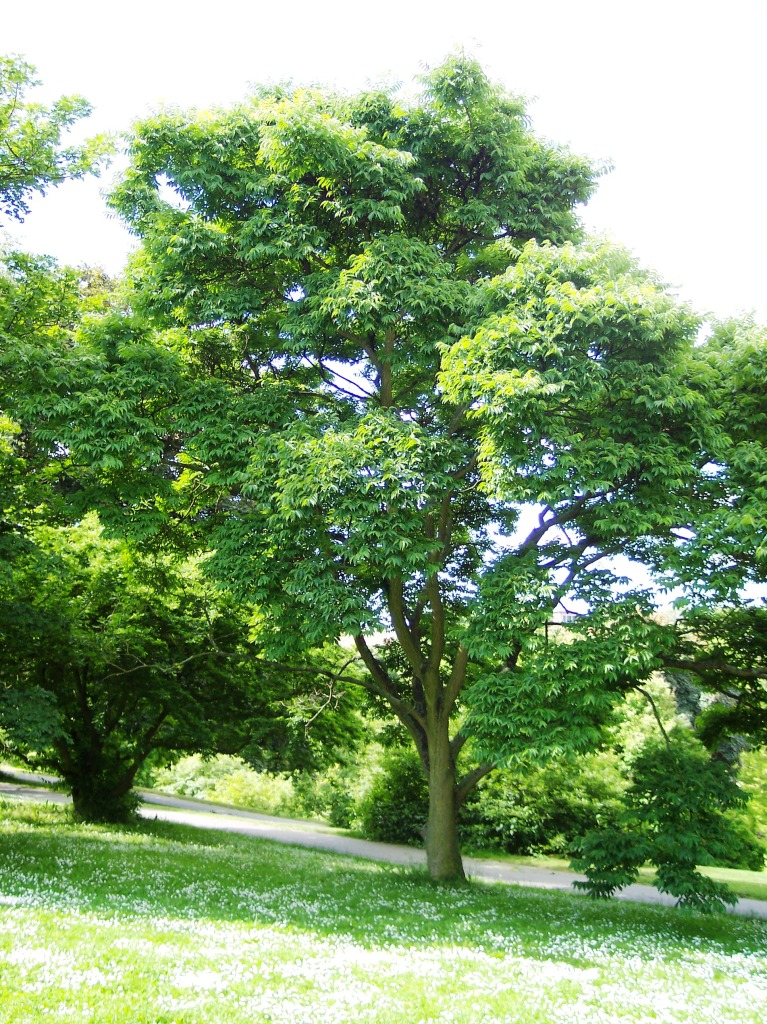
Phellodendron amurense planted in a garden in Denmark

One species, Phellodendron amurense (Chinese: 黄柏; pinyin: huáng bǎi; or 黄檗; pinyin: huáng bò; Russian: Бархат амурский "Barkhat Amurskiy" (Amur Velvet), also бархатное дерево, пробковое дерево), is one of the 50 fundamental herbs used in traditional Chinese medicine. Recently, Phellodendron has also attracted scientific attention because of the phytochemicals it produces:

- Berberine has antibacterial and anti-fungal properties
- Jatrorrhizine may be anti-mutagenic
- Phellodendrine has promise as an immune suppressant
- Palmatine may be a vasodilator

The phytochemical descriptions are included for informational purposes only and not for treatment purposes. The research at this stage is very preliminary. Traditionally, the bark is the principal part of the plant used medicinally, although oil from the fruit is also used. The species grows in Northern China, and in the Khabarovsk and Primorskiy regions of Russia.

Already identified as a significant forest invader in the mid-Atlantic region, Phellodendron amurense is an emerging species of concern in New England, and is identified as invasive or having invasive tendencies by state and private conservation authorities. Because the fruit is plentiful and high in sugars, Amur cork-tree attracts birds and mammals which help disperse its seeds. Because of its phytochemical profile and because the seedlings grow thickly, Phellodendron can out-compete other species. By suppressing reproduction of native hardwoods, Amur cork-tree can come to dominate native forests under favorable conditions. As a relatively new species of concern, its invasion biology and response to control are not well understood.
