= Phellodendrine =

Names
- IUPAC name 2,11-Dihydroxy-3,10-dimethoxyberbin-7α-ium
- Systematic IUPAC name (7S,13aS)-2,11-Dihydroxy-3,10-dimethoxy-7-methyl-5,8,13,13a-tetrahydro-6H-isoquinolino[3,2-a]isoquinolin-7-ium

Identifiers
CAS Number	6873-13-8
3D model (JSmol)	Interactive image
ChemSpider	2339019
PubChem CID	3081405
UNII	AR68S526RB
CompTox Dashboard (EPA)	DTXSID50218855
- InChI: InChI=1/C20H23NO4/c1-21-5-4-12-8-19(24-2)18(23)10-15(12)16(21)6-13-7-17(22)20(25-3)9-14(13)11-21/h7-10,16H,4-6,11H2,1-3H3,(H-,22,23)/p+1/t16-,21-/m0/s1 Key: RBBVPNQTBKHOEQ-ZJYUTNJKBY
- SMILES: O(c1cc3c(cc1O)C[C@H]4c2c(cc(OC)c(O)c2)CC[N@+]4(C3)C)C

Properties
Chemical formula	C_{20}H_{24}NO_{4}
Molar mass	342.4083 g/mol
Melting point	258 °C (496 °F; 531 K) (as iodide)
- Except where otherwise noted, data are given for materials in their standard state (at 25 °C [77 °F], 100 kPa). Infobox references

Phellodendrine is an alkaloid isolated originally from Phellodendron amurense (Rutaceae).

== See also ==
- Berberine
- Jatrorrhizine
- Palmatine
