= Sì miào wán =

Remedy in Traditional Chinese medicine

Sì miào wán (Chinese: 四妙丸), or the four marvels, is a remedy used in traditional Chinese medicine. It is available in powder and pill form. It contains, among other things, quercetin, berberine, and achyranthine.

== Contents ==
It contains the same ingredients as Sān miào wán ("Three marvel pills"), which are the bark of huáng bǎi ("yellow fir"), the root of cāng zhú ("[black] atractylodes"), and huái niú xī (the root of Achyranthes bidentata), plus the fourth, yi yi ren (Job's tears).

The active chemicals found in these substances include:

- Quercetin, which has an LD_{50} (the amount that kills 50 percent of mice fed the chemical) equal to the cytotoxic chemotherapy drug methotrexate, which is approximately 150 milligrams per kilogram of body weight; and
- Berberine, a yellow dye that is known to cause brain damage in infants and severe hemolysis (destruction of red blood cells) in some.

As with all herbal treatments that have not been standardized (diluted or concentrated on the basis of laboratory tests done on each batch produced), the amount of the active chemicals received in one dose is unknown.
