= Coscinium fenestratum =

- In Kerala, India

Conservation status
- Data Deficient (IUCN 3.1)

Scientific classification
- Kingdom: Plantae
- Clade: Tracheophytes
- Clade: Angiosperms
- Clade: Eudicots
- Order: Ranunculales
- Family: Menispermaceae
- Genus: Coscinium
- Species: C. fenestratum

Binomial name
- Coscinium fenestratum (Gaertn.) Colebr.

Synonyms
- Coscinium maingayi Pierre; Coscinium miosepalum Diels; Coscinium peltatum Merr.; Coscinium usitatum Pierre; Coscinium wallichianum Miers; Coscinium wightianum Miers ex Diels

Species of flowering plant

Coscinium fenestratum, the yellow vine or false calumba, is a flowering woody climber in the family Menispermaceae, native to South Asia and Mainland Southeast Asia. It is rare and critically endangered in many of its habitats.

== Description ==
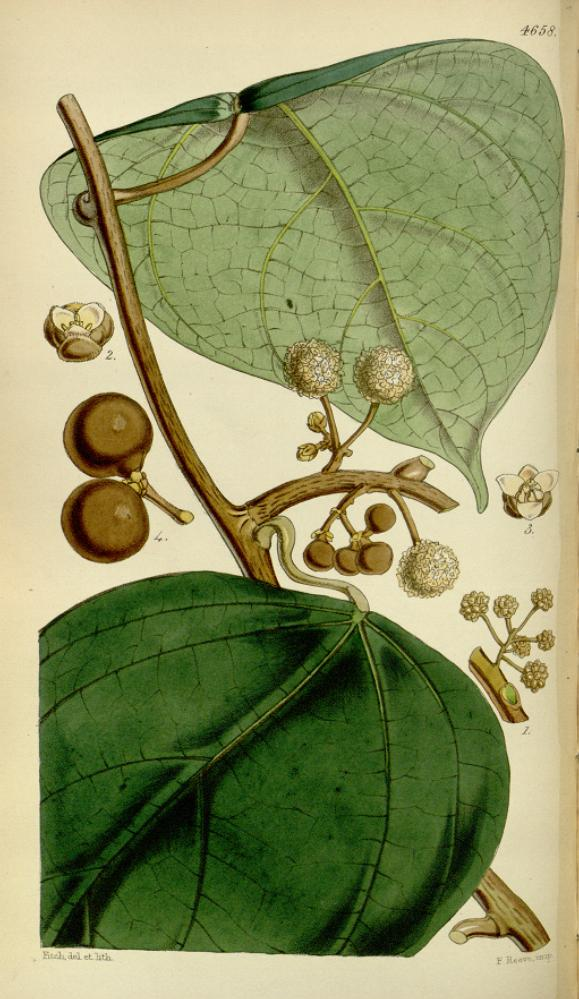
Illustration,1852

Coscinium fenestratum is a sturdy woody climber with leathery, shiny leaves and bright yellow sap. It is dioecious, flowering and fruiting in August to October. The fruits consists of one or two drupes up to 2 cm (0.8 in) across. The plant has a generation span of 25 years.

== Distribution ==
The habitat for Coscinium fenestratum spans South Asia and parts of Southeast Asia, from India to Indonesia. It can only thrive in a tropical climate and prefers mixed and dense evergreen forest, with fertile soil and high moisture.

The plant has been determined to be native to Sri Lanka and the Western Ghats in India. It is unclear if the populations in Cambodia, Vietnam and west Malaysia are truly wild or the result of cultivation.

== Use ==
Coscinium fenestratum has a long history as a medicinal plant in the various traditional medicines of the region where it grows. This includes Ayurveda, Unani and Siddha medicine in India, Sinhala medicine in Sri Lanka, the Kru Khmer healing traditions in Cambodia, traditional Vietnamese medicine of Thuốc Nam, etc. The plant is used for a large variety of diseases and conditions, from fevers and diabetes to celiac disease and snake bites. It is unclear if all these medicinal uses of C. fenestratum are backed up by science, but laboratory tests have shown that the plant has potent bioactive properties.

There is speculation that C. fenestratum might also have found a modern use in the illegal drug market industry.

== Bioactive compounds ==
The primary bioactive ingredient in Coscinium fenestratum is berberine, but also palmatine and jatrorrhizine.

== Critically endangered ==
Because of the growing populations and industrialization of Asia, the demand for Coscinium fenestratum has increased manifold in the last decades, decimating the natural distribution of the plant dramatically. It is therefore now listed as rare and critically endangered in many of its habitats. Some of these habitats are designated as protected areas or national parks, but that has not safeguarded the plant from opportunistic gathering.

Considering the entirety of C. fenestratum's range, not enough field data is available as of 2015 for any reliable assessment of its global status in the IUCN Red List. Locally however, IUCN has categorized C. fenestratum as follows:

- India: Critically endangered (1997, 2010, 2016)
- Sri Lanka: Indiscriminate (1997, 2015)
- Vietnam: Vulnerable (since 1997)
- Cambodia, Vietnam and west Malaysia: Data deficient (2015)

The Indian and Sri Lankan populations of C. fenestratum are probably the most disturbed and severely affected. Over a 75 year period (three generations for this species), the plant population has been reduced by 80% due to indiscriminate gathering by local people. Hardly any mature plants are left in the wild.

Experiments with cultivating Coscinium fenestratum, instead of harvesting the plant in its natural environment, is carried out at present.

== Trade and regulations ==
As of 2008, an estimated 140 metric tons (150 short tons) of raw material from C. fenestratum is traded each year in India (Ved and Goraya 2008). It is illegal to export C. fenestratum from India.

In some areas, like Cambodia and Laos for instance, C. fenestratum is harvested on a large scale and subsequently processed with toxic acids, posing a pollution threat to the local eco-systems. It is unclear who buys the yellow vine extractions, and for what purpose they are used. In Cambodia, hazardous processing like these are illegal since 2002, and since 2006 it has also been illegal to export both yellow vine and "yellow vine powder".

== Sources ==
- Documentary film: Death in the Forest; David O'Shea (reporter). SBS Dateline 2012. Investigations on the shooting of environmental activist Chut Wutty.
