= Ethyl caffeate =

- Chemical structure of ethyl caffeate

Names
- Preferred IUPAC name Ethyl (2E)-3-(3,4-dihydroxyphenyl)prop-2-enoate
- Other names Caffeic acid ethyl ester

Identifiers
CAS Number	102-37-4
3D model (JSmol)	Interactive image
ChEBI	CHEBI:132714
ChemSpider	4476132
PubChem CID	5317238
UNII	76GBB1JU5Y
CompTox Dashboard (EPA)	DTXSID70876375
- InChI: InChI=1S/C11H12O4/c1-2-15-11(14)6-4-8-3-5-9(12)10(13)7-8/h3-7,12-13H,2H2,1H3/b6-4+ Key: WDKYDMULARNCIS-GQCTYLIASA-N; InChI=1S/C11H12O4/c1-2-15-11(14)6-4-8-3-5-9(12)10(13)7-8/h3-7,12-13H,2H2,1H3/b6-4+ Key: WDKYDMULARNCIS-GQCTYLIASA-N
- SMILES: CCOC(=O)/C=C/C1=CC(=C(C=C1)O)O

Properties
Chemical formula	C_{11}H_{12}O_{4}
Molar mass	208.213 g·mol^{−1}
UV-vis (λ_{max})	324 nm and a shoulder at c. 295 nm in acidified methanol

Related compounds
Related compounds	Caffeic acid
- Except where otherwise noted, data are given for materials in their standard state (at 25 °C [77 °F], 100 kPa). Infobox references

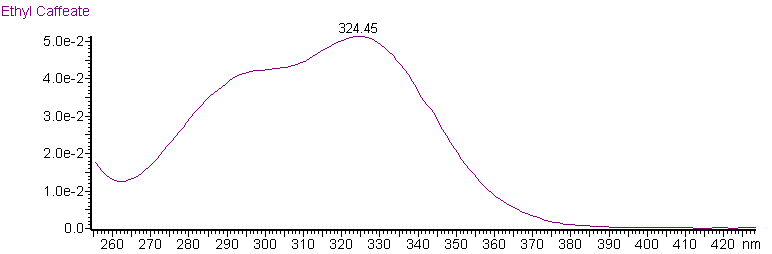
UV spectrum of ethyl caffeate.

Ethyl caffeate is an ester of a hydroxycinnamic acid, a naturally occurring organic compound.

== Natural occurrences ==
It can be found in Bidens pilosa, in Polygonum amplexicaule var. sinense.

It is also found in Huáng bǎi, one of the fifty fundamental herbs of traditional Chinese medicine, also known as Cortex Phellodendri, the bark of one of two species of Phellodendron tree: Phellodendron amurense or Phellodendron chinense.

It is also found in wines such as Verdicchio, a white wine from Marche, Italy.

== Health effects ==
Ethyl caffeate suppresses NF-kappaB activation and its downstream inflammatory mediators, iNOS, COX-2 and PGE2 in vitro or in mouse skin.

Ethyl caffeate administered intraperitoneally in rats previously is able to prevent the dimethylnitrosamine-induced loss in body and liver weight, as well as to reduce the degree of liver injury. It can be considered as a promising natural compound for future application in chronic liver disease.

Pharmacophore modeling, molecular docking, and molecular dynamics simulation studies also indicate that ethyl caffeate is a potential inhibitor of the aldosterone synthase (CYP11B2), a key enzyme for the biosynthesis of aldosterone, which plays a significant role for the regulation of blood pressure.

== Chemistry ==
Ethyl caffeate reacts with methylamine to produce green pigments.

== See also ==
- Phenolic compounds in wine
