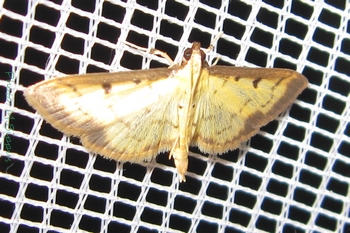

Scientific classification
- Kingdom: Animalia
- Phylum: Arthropoda
- Class: Insecta
- Order: Lepidoptera
- Family: Crambidae
- Subfamily: Spilomelinae
- Genus: Cristabotys; Maes, 2024

Type species
- Pyrausta pastrinalis Guenée, 1854

= Cristabotys =

Genus of moths

Cristabotys is a monotopic genus of moths in the family Crambidae. As of January 2026, the sole species was Cristabotys pastrinalis, formerly Pyrausta pastrinalis.

Cristabotys pastrinalis is a moth of the family Crambidae. The species was described by Achille Guenée in 1862. It is found in Réunion and Mauritius and in Cameroon and South Africa

Its larval hostplant is Bidens pilosa.
