= 4-hydroxyphenylpyruvate decarboxylase =

Class of enzymes

Identifiers
- EC no.: 4.1.1.80
- CAS no.: 109300-96-1

Databases
- BRENDA: enzyme data
- ExPASy: NiceZyme view
- KEGG: enzyme entry
- MetaCyc: metabolic pathway
- Rhea: reactions
- PDB structures: RCSB PDB PDBe PDBsum
- Gene Ontology: AmiGO / QuickGO
Search
- PMC: articles
- PubMed: articles
- NCBI: proteins

The enzyme 4-hydroxyphenylpyruvate decarboxylase (EC 4.1.1.80), characterised from Berberis species catalyzes the decarboxylation of 4-hydroxyphenylpyruvic acid to 4-hydroxyphenylacetaldehyde and carbon dioxide:

4-hydroxyphenylpyruvic acid
CO_{2}
4-hydroxyphenylacetaldehyde

The reaction is an early part of the biosynthesis of benzylisoquinoline alkaloids of the jatrorrhizine type. The enzyme is also present in the opium poppy.

This enzyme is a lyase, specifically a carboxy-lyase, which cleave carbon-carbon bonds. The systematic name of this enzyme class is 4-hydroxyphenylpyruvate carboxy-lyase (4-hydroxyphenylacetaldehyde-forming). This enzyme is also called 4-hydroxyphenylpyruvate carboxy-lyase.
