= C13H11NO3 =

The molecular formula C_{13}H_{11}NO_{3} (molar mass: 229.23 g/mol, exact mass: 229.073894 u) may refer to:

- γ-Fagarine
- Phenopicolinic acid
