= P. chinense =

P. chinense may refer to:

- Phellodendron chinense, a plant species
- Polygonum chinense, a synonym of Persicaria chinensis, a plant species found in Malaysia
