= Sān miào wán =

Traditional Chinese medicine

Sān miào wán (Chinese: 三妙丸; lit. 'three marvel pill') is a traditional Chinese medicine consisting of three components:

- 33% huáng bǎi (黃栢 or "yellow fir"), also known as Cortex Phellodendri, the bark of Phellodendron chinense Schneid. or Phellodendron amurense Rupr.
- 50% cāng zhú (蒼术 or "[black] atractylodes"), also known as Atractylodis Rhizoma, the root of Atractylodes lancea (thunb.) Dc or Atractylodes chinensis (dc.) Koidz.
- 17% huái niú xī (懷牛膝 or "ox knee"), also known as Archyanthis bidentatae Radix, the root of Achyranthes bidentata.

The preparation, as well as related herbal combinations such as èr miào wán (二妙丸, "two marvel pill", which contains equal proportions of huáng bǎi and cāng zhú) and sì miào wán (四妙丸, "four marvel pill"), has been used traditionally in treatment of gout. Sān miào wán has been reported to lower serum and liver uric acid concentration in mice with hyperuricemia, but not normal mice, by suppressing xanthine oxidase and downregulating production of mRNA for renal uric acid transporter mURAT1.
