= Kaempferol 7-O-glucoside =

Names
- IUPAC name 7-(β-D-Glucopyranosyloxy)-3,4′,5-trihydroxyflavone
- Systematic IUPAC name 3,5-Dihydroxy-2-(4-hydroxyphenyl)-7-{[(2S,3R,4S,5S,6R)-3,4,5-trihydroxy-6-(hydroxymethyl)oxan-2-yl]oxy}-4H-1-benzopyran-4-one
- Other names Kaempferol-7-O-beta-D-glucoside

Identifiers
CAS Number	16290-07-6
3D model (JSmol)	Interactive image
ChemSpider	8270716
PubChem CID	10095180
UNII	RZF1QN1Z8R
- InChI: InChI=1S/C21H20O11/c22-7-13-15(25)17(27)19(29)21(32-13)30-10-5-11(24)14-12(6-10)31-20(18(28)16(14)26)8-1-3-9(23)4-2-8/h1-6,13,15,17,19,21-25,27-29H,7H2/t13-,15-,17+,19-,21-/m1/s1 Key: YPWHZCPMOQGCDQ-HMGRVEAOSA-N; InChI=1/C21H20O11/c22-7-13-15(25)17(27)19(29)21(32-13)30-10-5-11(24)14-12(6-10)31-20(18(28)16(14)26)8-1-3-9(23)4-2-8/h1-6,13,15,17,19,21-25,27-29H,7H2/t13-,15-,17+,19-,21-/m1/s1 Key: YPWHZCPMOQGCDQ-HMGRVEAOBK
- SMILES: C1=CC(=CC=C1C2=C(C(=O)C3=C(C=C(C=C3O2)O[C@H]4[C@@H]([C@H]([C@@H]([C@H](O4)CO)O)O)O)O)O)O

Properties
Chemical formula	C_{21}H_{20}O_{11}
Molar mass	448.380 g·mol^{−1}
- Except where otherwise noted, data are given for materials in their standard state (at 25 °C [77 °F], 100 kPa). Infobox references

Kaempferol 7-O-glucoside is a flavonol glucoside. It can be found in Smilax china, and in the fern Asplenium rhizophyllum, and its hybrid descendants, as part of a complex with caffeic acid.

== Derivatives ==
Amurensin is the tert-amyl alcohol derivative of kaempferol 7-O-glucoside. 6'''-O-acetyl amurensin is found in the leaves of Phellodendron japonicum.
