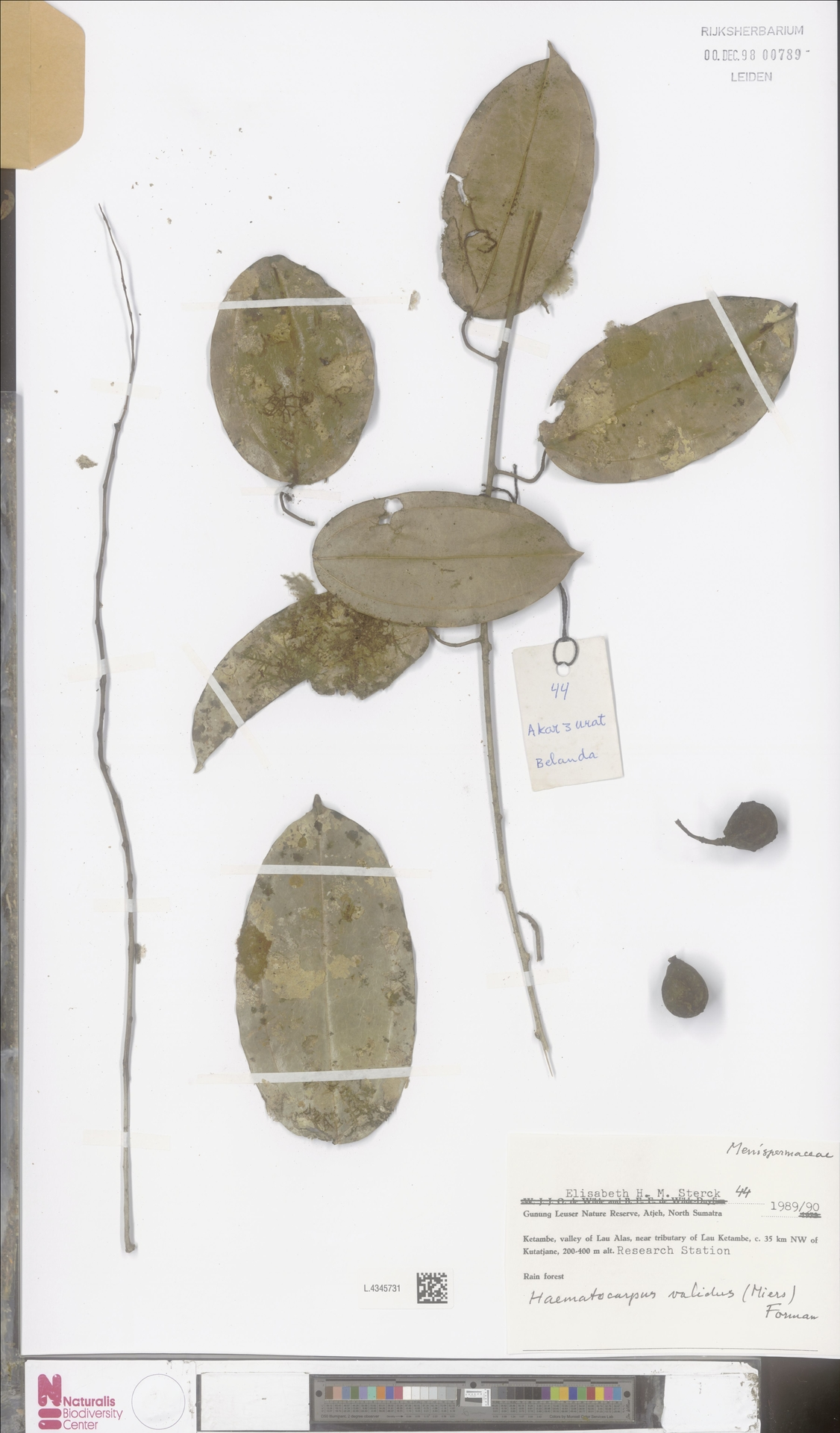

Scientific classification
- Kingdom: Plantae
- Clade: Tracheophytes
- Clade: Angiosperms
- Clade: Eudicots
- Order: Ranunculales
- Family: Menispermaceae
- Genus: Haematocarpus; Miers (1867)

Synonyms
- Heterotypic Synonyms: Baterium Miers; Fibraureopsis Yamam.

= Haematocarpus =

Genus of flowering plants

Haematocarpus is a genus of flowering plants in the family Menispermaceae.

It is native to the Andaman Islands, Assam, Bangladesh, Borneo, East Himalaya, Java, Laos, Myanmar, the Nicobar Islands, the Philippines, Sulawesi, Sumatra, and Thailand.

== Species ==
Accepted species in the genus include:

- Haematocarpus subpeltatus Miers - type species – synonyms: Fibraurea elliptica, Fibraureopsis smilacifolia
- Haematocarpus validus (Miers) Bakh.f. ex Forman - synonyms: Baterium validum, Fibraurea haematocarpus, Haematocarpus comptus, H. incusus, H. thomsonii
