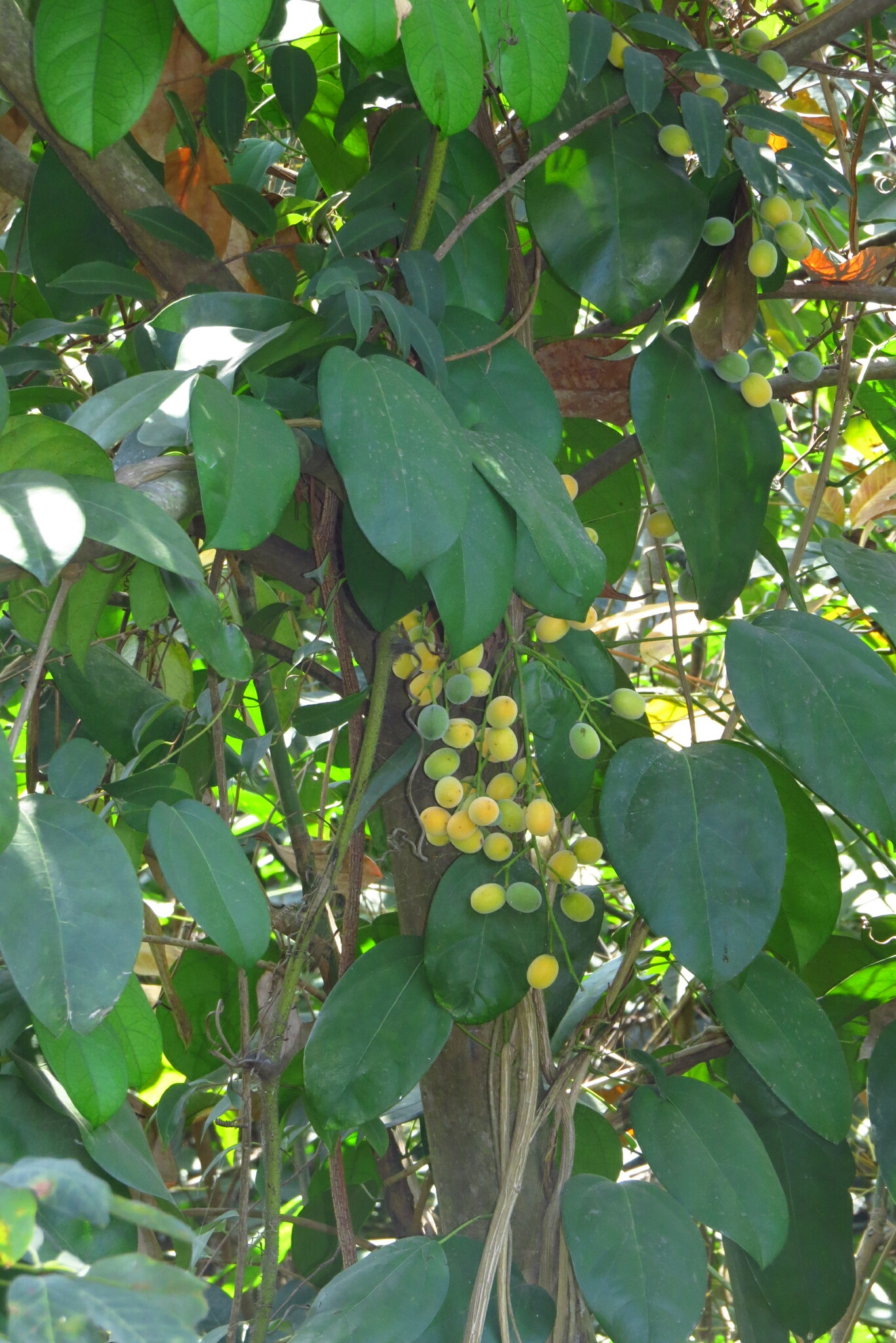

Scientific classification
- Kingdom: Plantae
- Clade: Embryophytes
- Clade: Tracheophytes
- Clade: Angiosperms
- Clade: Eudicots
- Order: Ranunculales
- Family: Menispermaceae
- Genus: Fibraurea
- Species: F. tinctoria

Binomial name
- Fibraurea tinctoria Lour.

Synonyms
- Cocculus fibraurea DC.; Fibraurea chloroleuca Miers; Fibraurea fasciculata Miers; Fibraurea laxa Miers; Fibraurea manipurensis Brace ex Diels; Fibraurea trotteri Watt ex Diels; Menispermum tinctorium Spreng.; Tinomiscium nicobaricum N.P.Balakr.

= Fibraurea tinctoria =

Species of plant

Fibraurea tinctoria is a species of flowering plant in the family Menispermaceae. It is native to Assam, Borneo, Cambodia, India, Java, Laos, Malaysia, Myanmar, the Nicobar Islands, the Philippines, Sulawesi, Sumatra, Thailand, and Vietnam, where it grows in wet tropical areas. It is considered locally common. It fruits in April and May, producing yellow-orange drupes. Common names for this plant include yellow root (East Kalimantan), akar palo (Aceh), and akar kuning (Indonesian) (Central Kalimantan).

== Research ==
The plant is used in Indonesian traditional medicine, primarily because it contains berberine, an isoquinoline alkaloid under preliminary research to identify its possible properties.

During a field observation, a male Sumatran orangutan, known to researchers as Rakus, chewed vine leaves and applied the masticated plant material to an open wound on his face. According to primatologists who had been observing Rakus at a nature preserve, "Five days later the facial wound was closed, while within a few weeks it had healed, leaving only a small scar."
