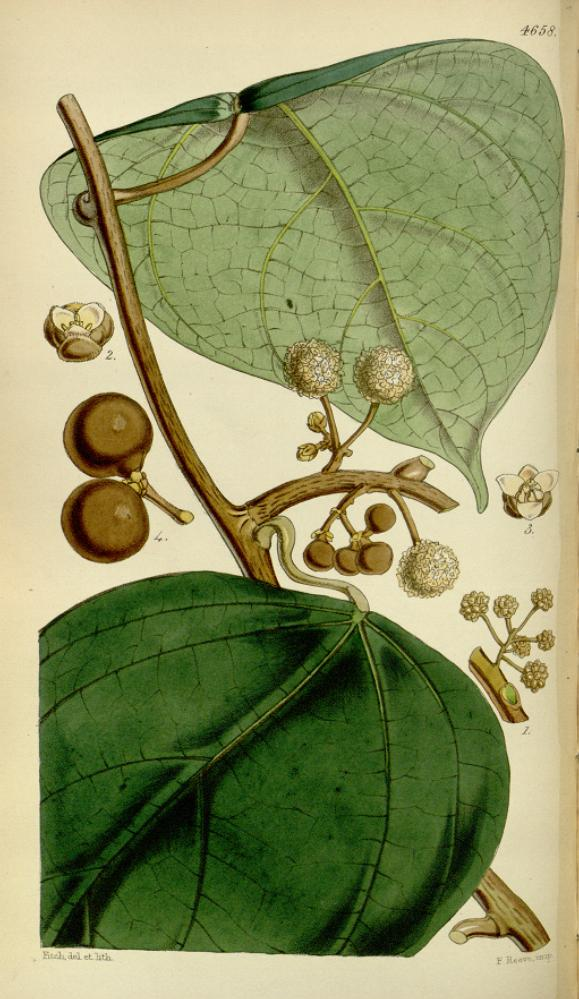
- Illustration of plant parts from Coscinium fenestratum (1852).

Scientific classification
- Kingdom: Plantae
- Clade: Tracheophytes
- Clade: Angiosperms
- Clade: Eudicots
- Order: Ranunculales
- Family: Menispermaceae
- Genus: Coscinium; Colebr., 1821

Species
- Coscinium blumeanum; Coscinium fenestratum

Synonyms
- Pereiria Lindl., 1838

= Coscinium (plant) =

Genus of flowering plants

Coscinium is a genus of flowering plants in the family Menispermaceae.
