= Huang Bai =

Herb in Chinese medicine

Huáng bǎi (黃栢 or 黃柏, literally "yellow cypress"), huáng bó (黃柏) or huáng bò (黃檗) is one of the fifty fundamental herbs of traditional Chinese medicine. Known also as Cortex Phellodendri, it is the bark of one of two species of Phellodendron tree: Phellodendron amurense or Phellodendron chinense.

Huáng bǎi
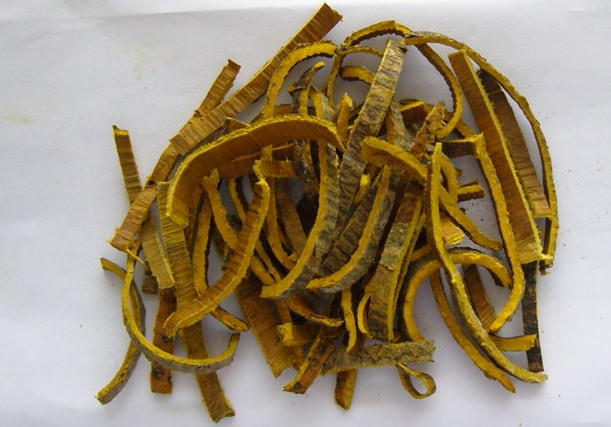
Alternate names: huáng bò, yuán bò
Source
Tree bark of the Rutaceae plants Phellodendron chinense Schneid. or Phellodendron amurense
Medicinal activity
Taste	bitter, cold
Tropism	kidney, urinary bladder, large intestine
Efficacy	clears and dries damp heat? (清热燥湿), flushes away fire and removes steam? (泻火除蒸), binds up poison and cures sores? (解毒疗疮)
Uses
Indications	Moist heat (下焦湿热症状)
Internal use	Pills or powder
External use	As suitable
Recommendations
Counterindications	Spleen weakness
Manufacture
Harvesting	Tree bark collected March to May
Storage	Dry and ventilated place
Processing	Salt, alcohol, charcoal? methods
Chinese medicine chemical ingredient
berberine

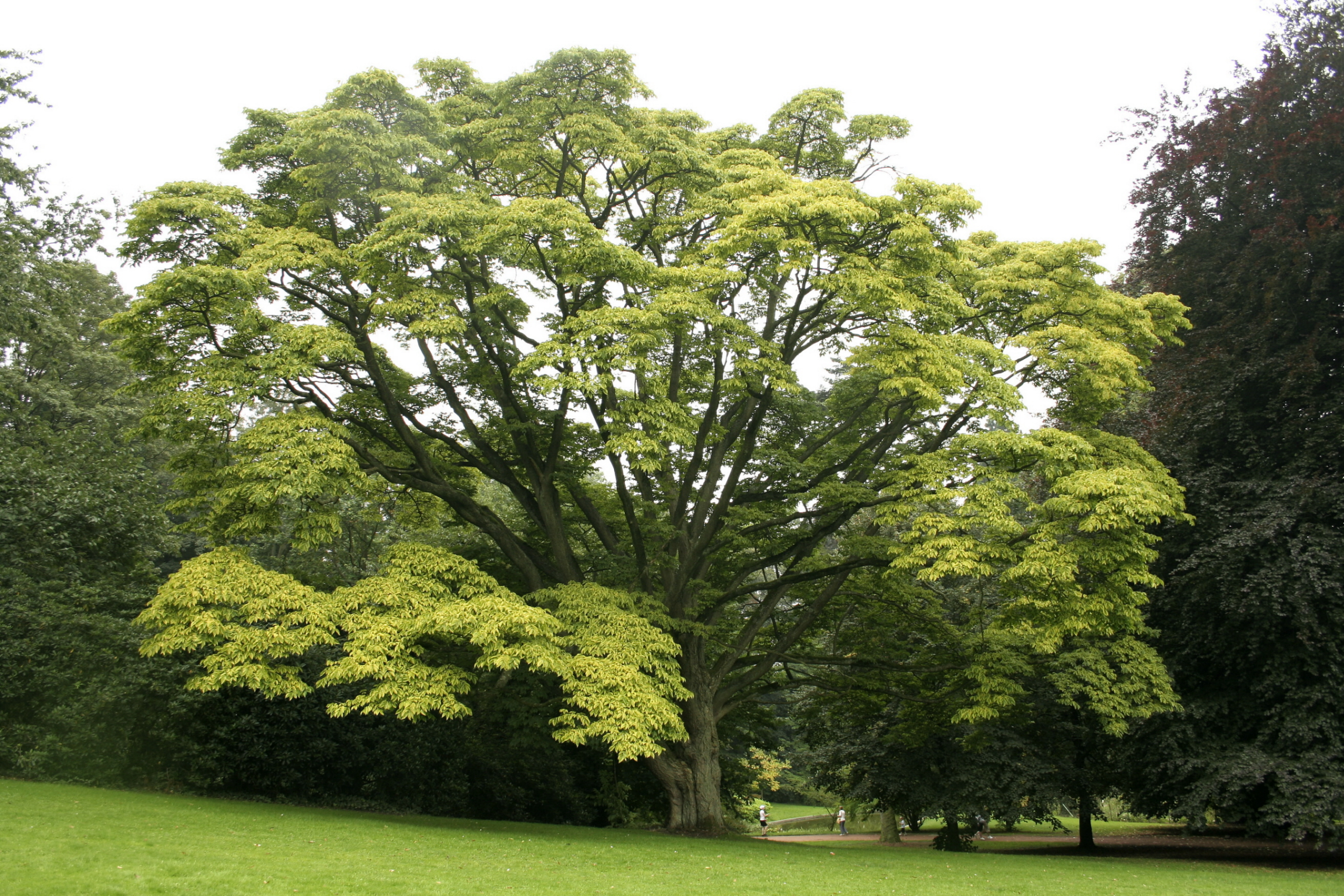
A fully mature (150 yr) Phellodendron amurense tree. Huáng bǎi is typically harvested from trees 10 years old.

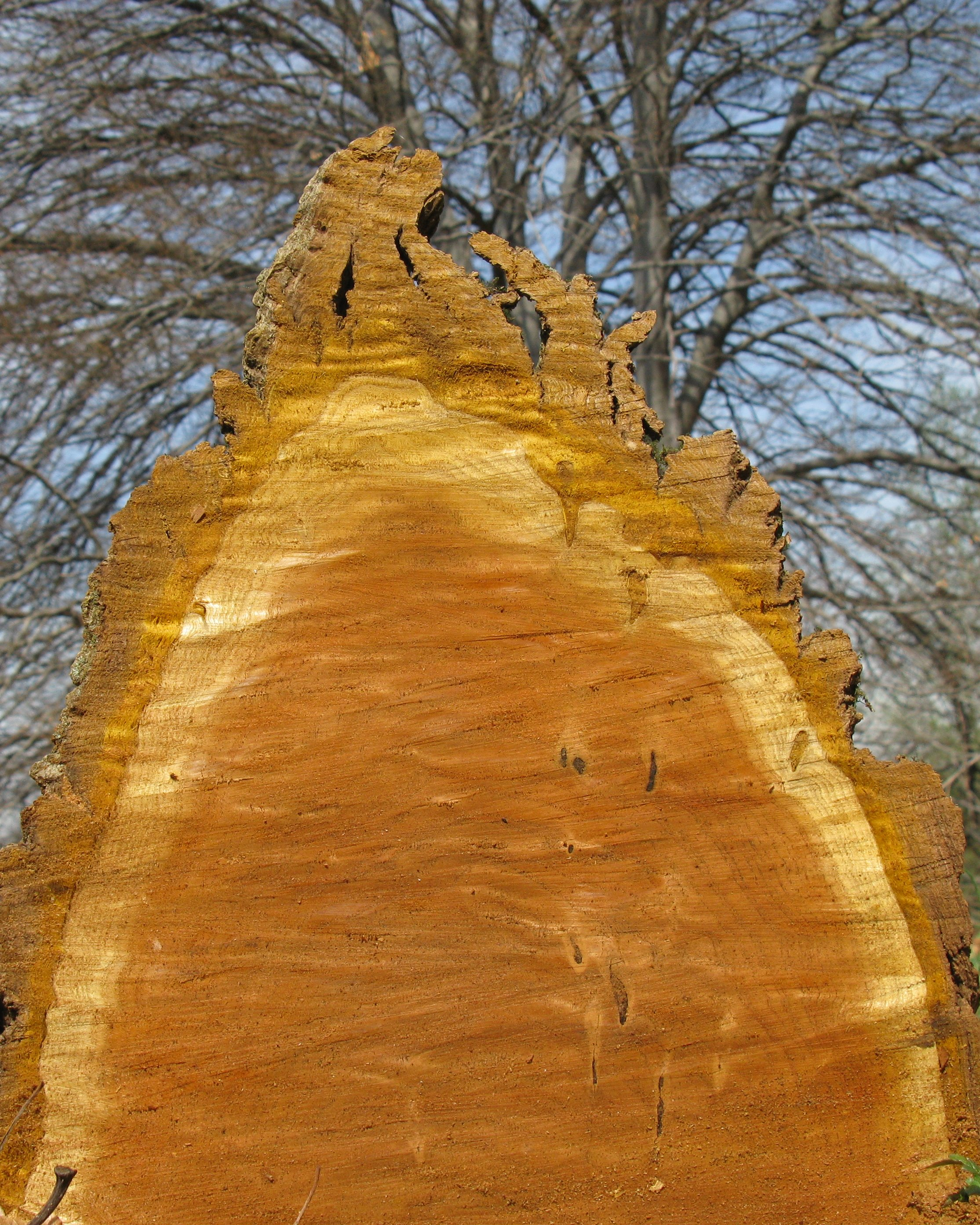
Phellodendron amurense cross-section. For a younger specimen see

== Cultivation ==
For Phellodendron amurense (关黄柏, i.e. "highland Phellodendron") one of the major producing areas is Taoshan District of Heilongjiang province, though other regions of Heilongjiang, Jilin, Liaoning and Inner Mongolia may also be suitable. These provinces are in the far northeast of China, near the Heilong Jiang river, known in Russian as the Аму́р (Amur River), and Phellodendron amurense is commonly known as the Amur cork tree.

Phellodendron chinense (川黄柏, i.e. "lowland Phellodendron") producing areas include Sichuan, Hubei, Guizhou, Yunnan, and Guangxi.

== Preparation ==
Bark is collected during Qingming (Pure Brightness), the fifth solar term (April 4–20). It is sun-dried and cut into slices. The bark may be used raw or fried with salt. Typical dosage is 3–10 grams. A variety of methods of water and ethanol extraction may have differing activities (see below) and methods such as "semi-bionic extraction" have been investigated to improve yields. Some pharmacological activities of the bark can be standardized by analyzing the level of berberine using a monoclonal antibody, thin-layer chromatography, HPLC, potentiometry, or acidic potassium permanganate chemiluminescence. There are quantitative differences between the two species of Cortex Phellodendri (P. amurense and chinense) and it has been suggested that they should be used as separate resources in the clinic. An analysis of 31 commercial samples in 1993 found that the total level of five alkaloids in samples of P. wilsonii and P. amurense var. sachalinense was 4.1% (mostly berberine), while the level in P. amurense and Ph. chinense was 1.5%.

The levels of four harmful trace heavy metals (arsenic, cadmium, mercury, and thallium) in P. chinense for export are limited by the Pharmacopoeia of the People's Republic of China and the Green Trade Standard for Importing and Exporting Medicinal Plant and Preparation.

== History ==
The earliest known writings about this preparation are found in the Shennong ben cao jing

== Traditional attributes ==
The bark is categorized in a traditional Chinese medicine counterpart of humorism, Wu Xing, as bitter and cold, affecting the kidney, urinary bladder and large intestine meridians. It is said "to clear heat and dry dampness", and "to reduce fire and release toxins".

== Biochemical analysis ==
Small molecules found in the bark include:

- berberine and oxyberberine
- caffeic acid ethyl ester
- isovanillin
- ferulic acid
- (+/-)-5,5'-dimethoxylariciresinol
- methyl beta-orsellinate
- obacunone
- limonin and 12alpha-hydroxylimonin
- nomilin
- γ-Fagarine
- canthin-6-one
- 4-methoxy-N-methyl-2-quinolone
- palmatine and oxypalmatine
- (+/-)-lyoniresinol
- β-sitosterol
- stigmasterine
- amurenlactone A
- amurenamide A
- phellodensins and phellodenols
- (2R)-sodium 3-phenyllactate
- jatrorrhizine
- an isocoumarin, 3-acetyl-3,4-dihydro-5,6-dimethoxy-1H-2-benzopyran-1-one
- Ala-Pro-Trp-Cys, a glutathione S-transferase activating peptide
