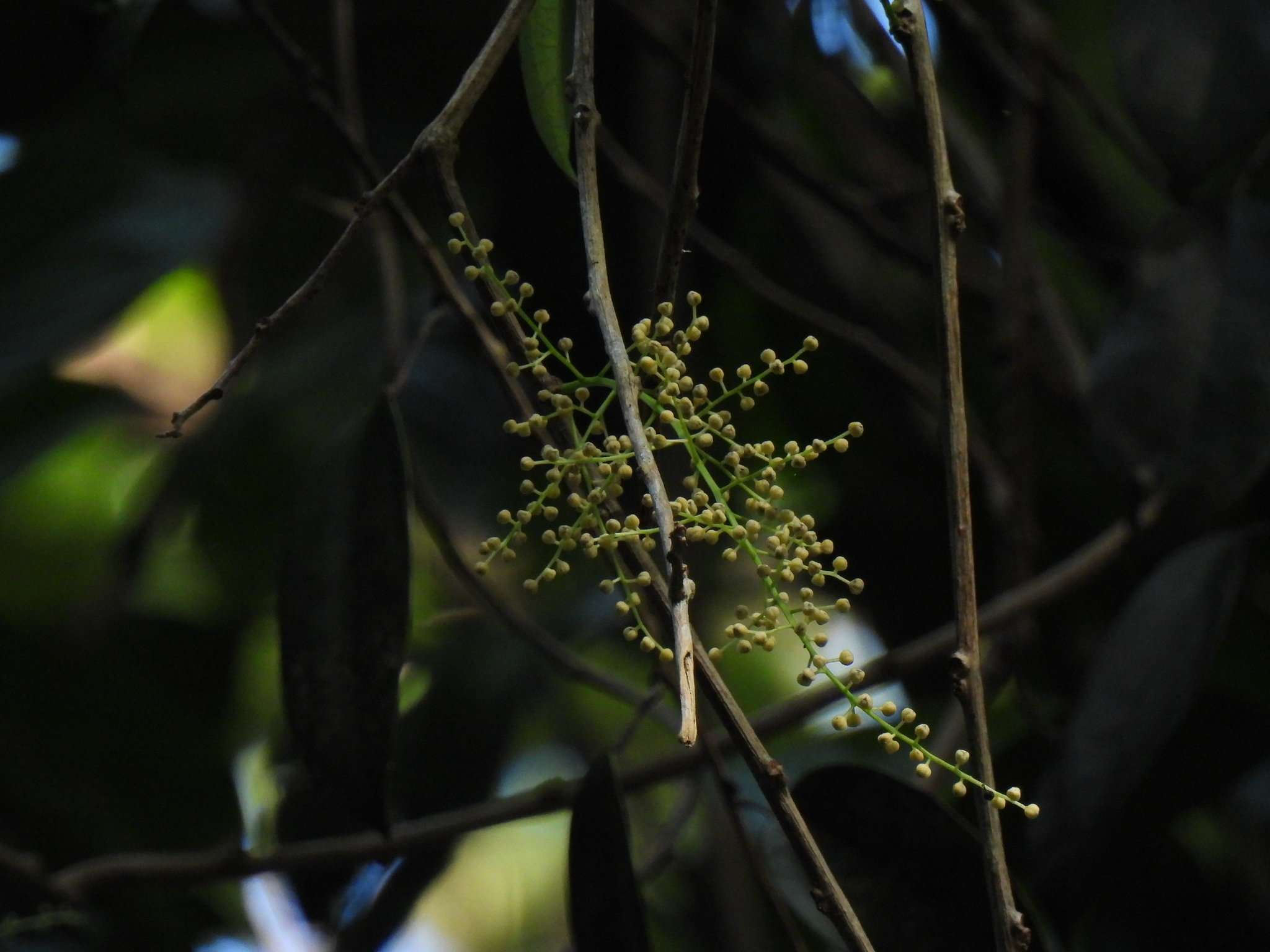
- Fibraurea tinctoria

Scientific classification
- Kingdom: Plantae
- Clade: Tracheophytes
- Clade: Angiosperms
- Clade: Eudicots
- Order: Ranunculales
- Family: Menispermaceae
- Subfamily: Chasmantheroideae
- Genus: Fibraurea; Lour., 1790

= Fibraurea =

Genus of flowering plants

Fibraurea is an Asian plant genus in the family Menispermaceae.

== Species ==
Plants of the World Online includes:

1. Fibraurea darshanii Udayan & K.Ravik.: India (Karnataka, Kerala)
2. Fibraurea recisa Pierre: southern China, Indo-China (in Việt Nam hoàng đằng) - herbal
3. Fibraurea tinctoria Lour. (type species; synonyms: Fibraurea chloroleuca (Miers), Fibraurea fasciculata (Miers), Fibraurea laxa (Miers), Fibraurea trotteri (Watt), Fibraurea manipurensis Brace ex Diels): India, Indo-China, Malesia including Borneo.

No longer included in this genus:

- Fibraurea elliptica (Yamamoto) = Haematocarpus subpeltatus Merr.: (Luzon, Philippines).
- Fibraurea haematocarpus Hook.f. & Thomson = Haematocarpus validus (prev. H. thomsonii) Miers

== Medicine ==
Fibraurea tinctoria, known locally as akar kuning, is used by Sumatran Oragutan as a pain-reliever, anti-inflammatory, antibacterial, and antifungal.
