= Amurensin (flavonol) =

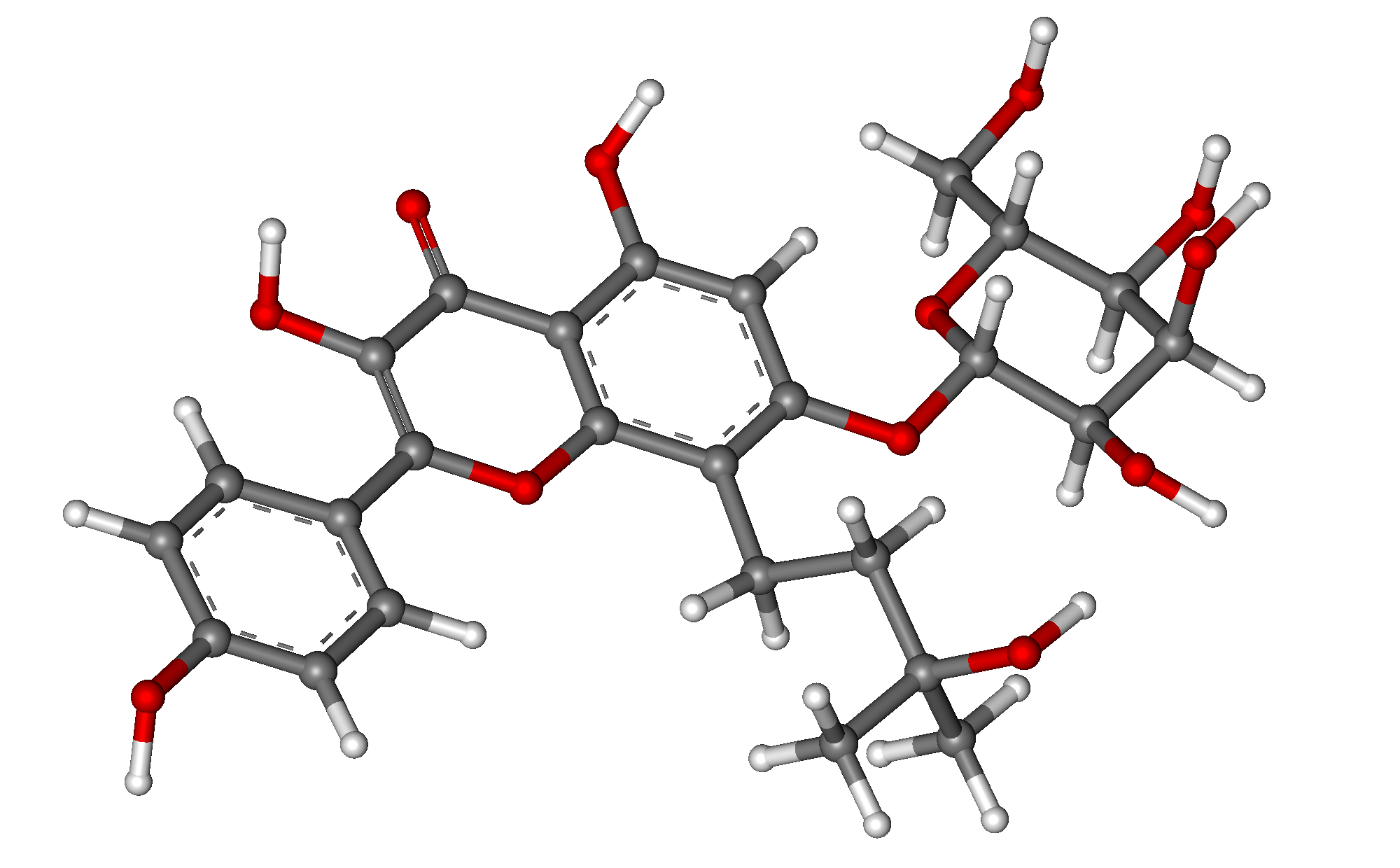

Names
- IUPAC name 7-(β-D-Glucopyranosyloxy)-3,4′,5-trihydroxy-8-(3-hydroxy-3-methylbutyl)flavone
- Systematic IUPAC name 3,5-Dihydroxy-8-(3-hydroxy-3-methylbutyl)-2-(4-hydroxyphenyl)-7-{[(2S,3R,4S,5S,6R)-3,4,5-trihydroxy-6-(hydroxymethyl)oxan-2-yl]oxy}-4H-1-benzopyran-4-one

Identifiers
| CAS Number | 641-94-1 |
| 3D model (JSmol) | Interactive image |
| ChemSpider | 20120043 |
| PubChem CID | 5318156 |
| UNII | F3862WT2AZ |
| CompTox Dashboard (EPA) | DTXSID40982614 |
- InChI: InChI=1S/C26H30O12/c1-26(2,35)8-7-13-15(36-25-22(34)20(32)18(30)16(10-27)37-25)9-14(29)17-19(31)21(33)23(38-24(13)17)11-3-5-12(28)6-4-11/h3-6,9,16,18,20,22,25,27-30,32-35H,7-8,10H2,1-2H3/t16-,18-,20+,22-,25-/m1/s1 Key: UNHHWEHQUUGKEE-MLLLWRCASA-N; InChI=1/C26H30O12/c1-26(2,35)8-7-13-15(36-25-22(34)20(32)18(30)16(10-27)37-25)9-14(29)17-19(31)21(33)23(38-24(13)17)11-3-5-12(28)6-4-11/h3-6,9,16,18,20,22,25,27-30,32-35H,7-8,10H2,1-2H3/t16-,18-,20+,22-,25-/m1/s1 Key: UNHHWEHQUUGKEE-MLLLWRCABA
- SMILES: CC(C)(CCC1=C(C=C(C2=C1OC(=C(C2=O)O)C3=CC=C(C=C3)O)O)O[C@H]4[C@@H]([C@H]([C@@H]([C@H](O4)CO)O)O)O)O

Properties
| Chemical formula | C_{26}H_{30}O_{12} |
| Molar mass | 534.50 g/mol |
| Density | 1.581 g/mL |
- Except where otherwise noted, data are given for materials in their standard state (at 25 °C [77 °F], 100 kPa). verify (what is ?) Infobox references

Amurensin is a flavonol, a type of flavonoid. It is the tert-amyl alcohol derivative of kaempferol 7-O-glucoside. It can be found in Phellodendron amurense.

== Related compounds ==
6"'-O-acetyl amurensin is found in the leaves of Phellodendron japonicum.
