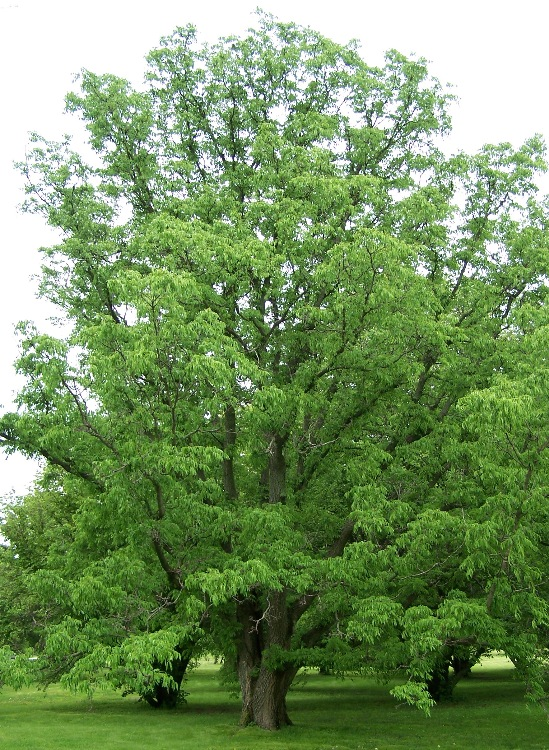
- Phellodendron amurense Morton Arboretum acc. 568-27*3

Scientific classification
- Kingdom: Plantae
- Clade: Tracheophytes
- Clade: Angiosperms
- Clade: Eudicots
- Clade: Rosids
- Order: Sapindales
- Family: Rutaceae
- Genus: Phellodendron
- Species: P. amurense

Binomial name
- Phellodendron amurense Rupr.

Synonyms
- List: Phellodendron amurense var. molle (Nakai) S.H.Li & S.Z.Liou; Phellodendron insulare Nakai; Phellodendron japonicum Maxim.; Phellodendron kodamanum Makino; Phellodendron lavallei Dode; Phellodendron molle Nakai; Phellodendron nikkomontanum Makino; Phellodendron piriforme E.L.Wolf; Phellodendron sachalinense (F.Schmidt) Sarg.

= Phellodendron amurense =

Amur cork tree

Species of tree

Phellodendron amurense is a species of tree in the family Rutaceae, commonly called the Amur cork tree. It is a major source of huáng bò (Chinese: 黄柏 or 黄檗), one of the 50 fundamental herbs used in traditional Chinese medicine. The Ainu people used its fruit, called "shikerebe-ni" (in Ainu, sikerpe), as a painkiller. It is known as hwangbyeok in Korean and (キハダ) kihada in Japanese.

It is native to eastern Asia: northern China, northeast China, Korea, Ussuri, Amur, and Japan, the Amur cork tree is considered invasive in many parts of North America. The State of Massachusetts lists it as a noxious weed.

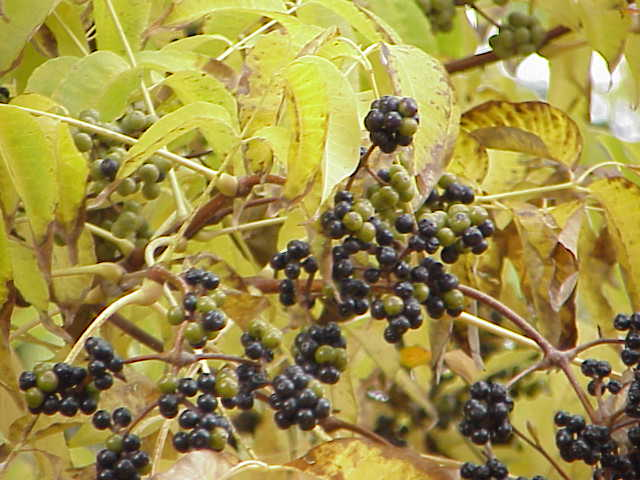
Autumn foliage and fruit

== Medicinal use ==
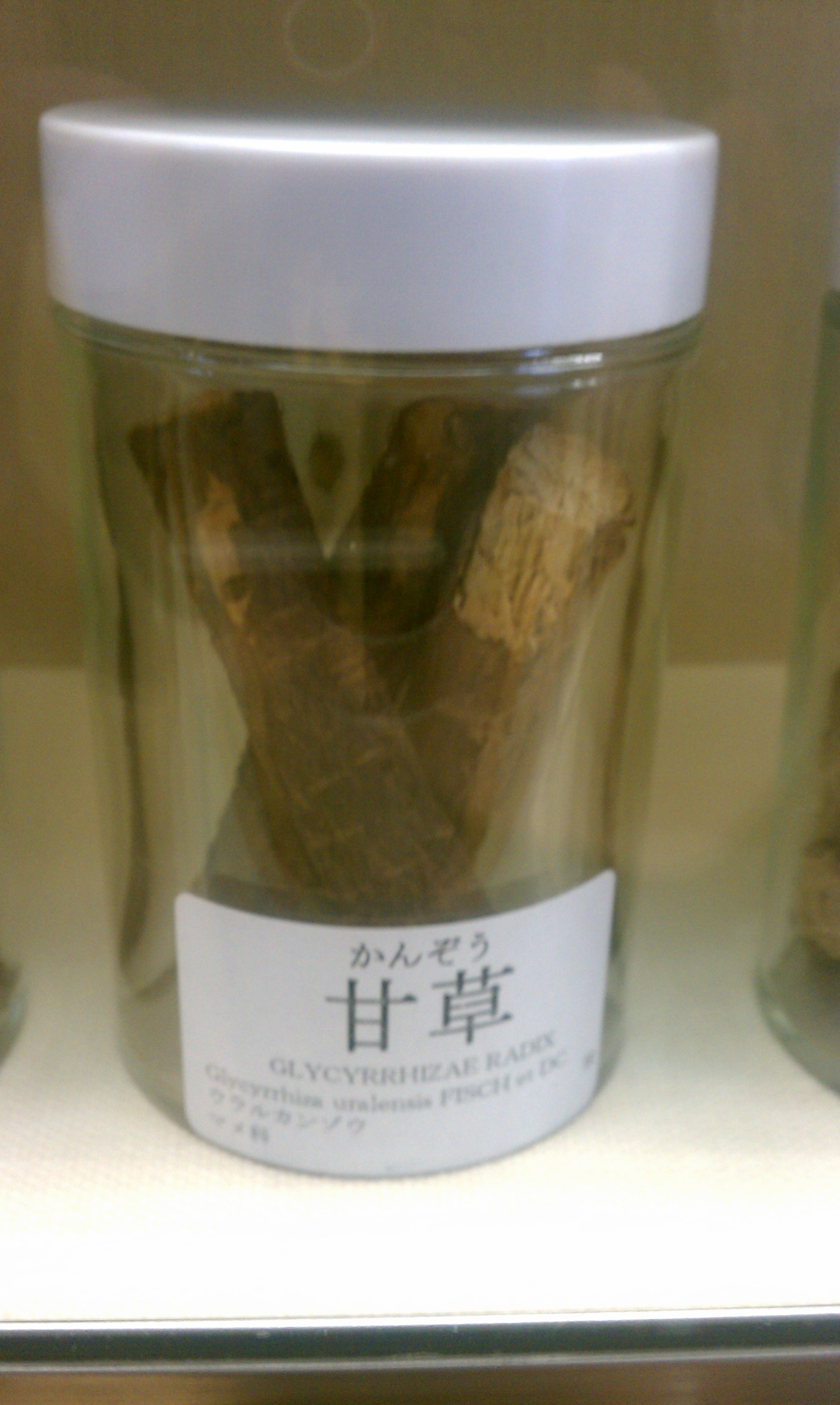
Plant as used in Chinese herbology. Note the pictured is a photo of Licorice Root/ GanCao, not Phellodendron. (crude medicine)

It has been used as a Chinese traditional medicine for the treatment of meningitis, bacillary dysentery, pneumonia, tuberculosis, tumours, jaundice and liver cirrhosis.

Used orally to treat abdominal pain, diarrhea, gastroenteritis and urinary tract infections. Phellodendron amurense may protect cartilage against osteoarthritis progression. It may prove to be a potentially important chemopreventive agent for lung cancer.

Phellodendron amurense is able to inhibit prostatic contractility suggesting that it may be useful in the treatment of urological disorders caused by prostatic urethral obstruction such as benign prostatic hyperplasia (BPH). Nexrutine (bark extract from Phellodendron amurense) may have potential to prevent prostate tumor development.

Compounds in the leaves (quercetin, quercetin-3-O-beta-D-glucoside, quercetin-3-O-beta-D-galactoside and kaempferol-3-O-beta-D-glucoside) demonstrated significant free radical scavenging activity comparable to vitamin E.

The tree has both antibiotic and antimicrobial properties due to the alkaloids contained within the plant material. The major chemical constituents of its bark are the isoquinoline alkaloids, palmatine, jatrorrhizine, phellodendorine with berberine found within the leaves. The indole alkaloid has also been found in the roots of the young dioecious trees.

Dye extracted from the bark was used historically across East Asia to color paper for sutras and other documents, including the Diamond Sutra. The yellow dye protected against insect damage.

== Oil ==
Amur cork tree fruit oil is a pressed oil extracted from the fruit of Phellodendron amurense. The bark of the tree is an important herbal medicine in China. The oil has insecticidal properties similar to pyrethrum. The oil contains a variety of biologically active substances, including flavonoids (diosmin), alkaloids (berberine, jatrorrhizine, palmatine), saponins, and coumarins. Medicinal applications of the oil include treatment of pancreatitis, reduction of cholesterol and sugar in blood and the treatment of various skin diseases.

== Chemistry ==
Essential oils:

- Fruit oil contains myrcene (62.3–70.3%) and β-caryophyllene (6.8–10.5%)
- Leaf oil contains β-elemol (18.5%) and (Z)-β-ocimene (12.6%)
- Flower oil contains (Z)-β-ocimene (9.5%), β-elemol (9.4%), myrcene (7.8%) and nonacosane (7.7%)

Amurensin, a tert-amyl alcohol derivative of kaempferol 7-O-glucoside, can be found in P. amurense.

== Gallery ==
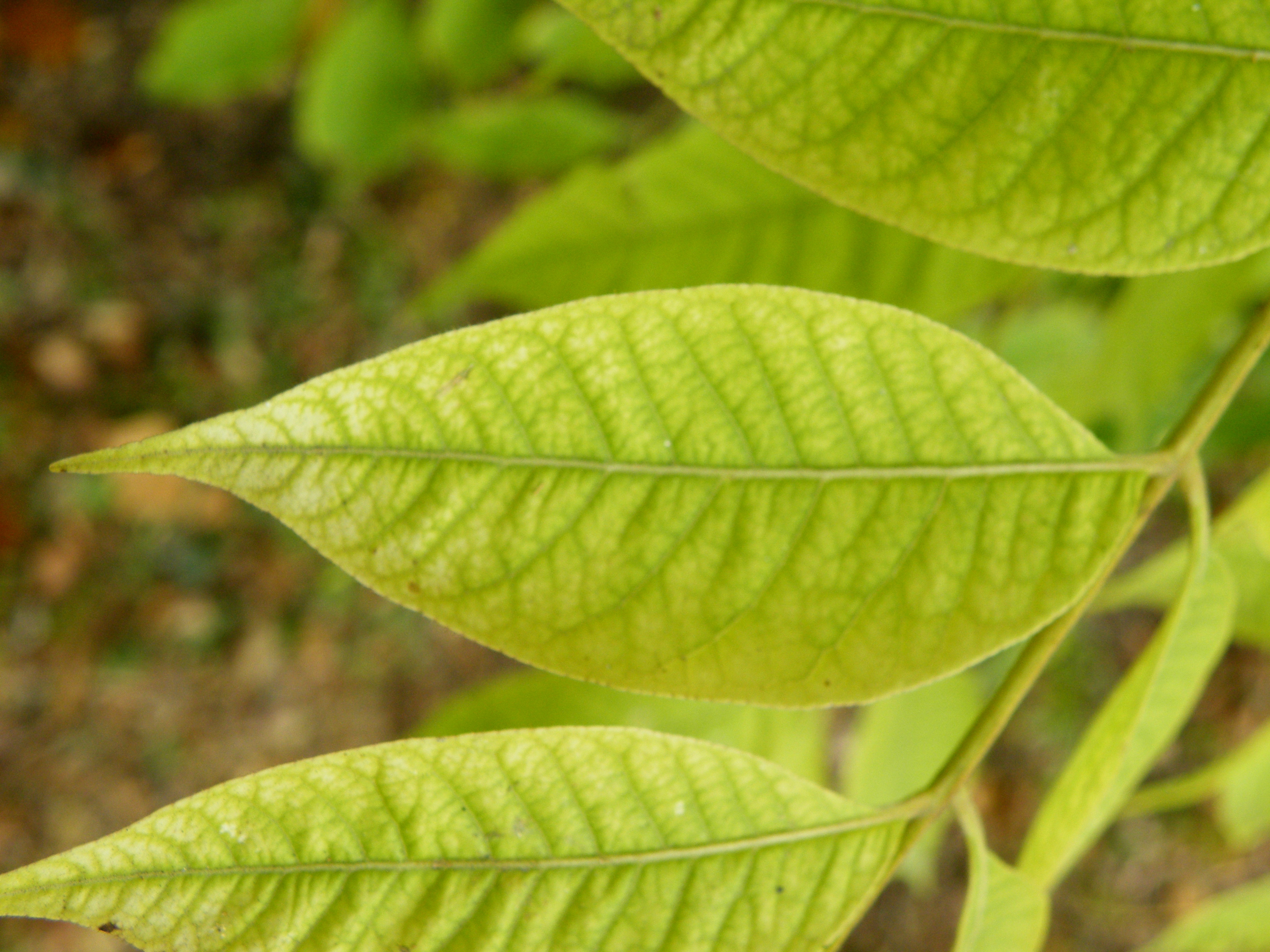
Leaf

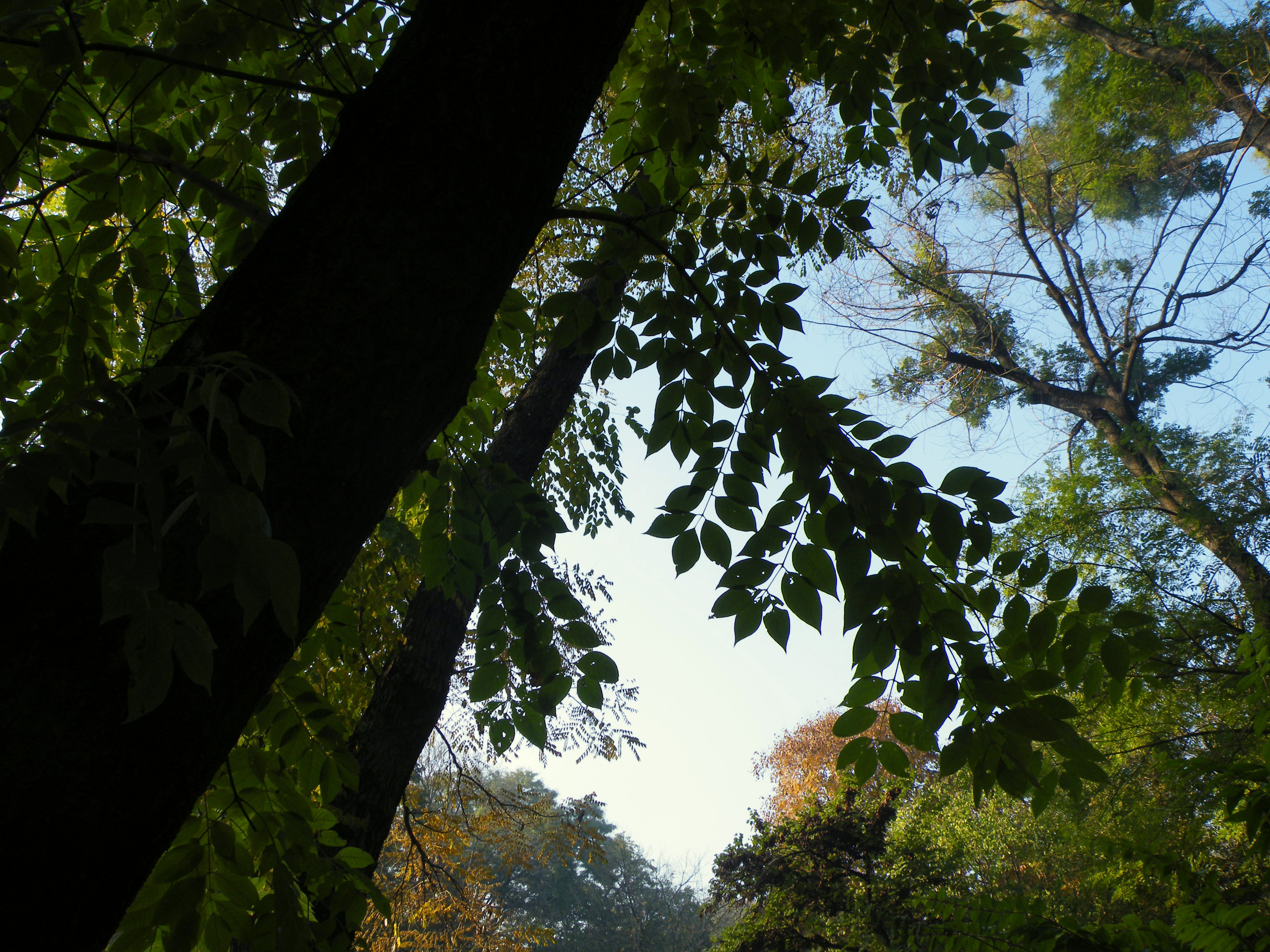
Tree

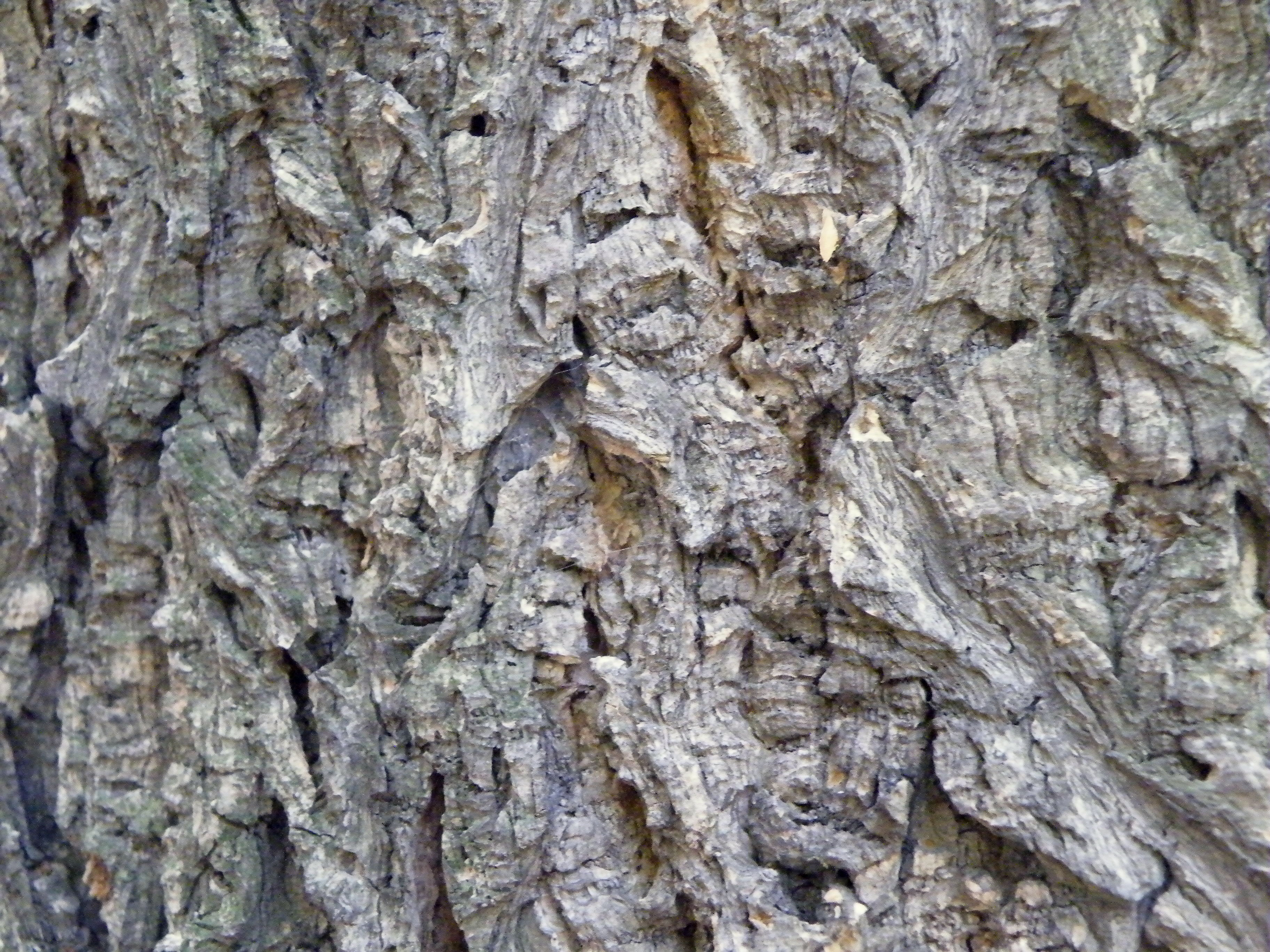
Bark

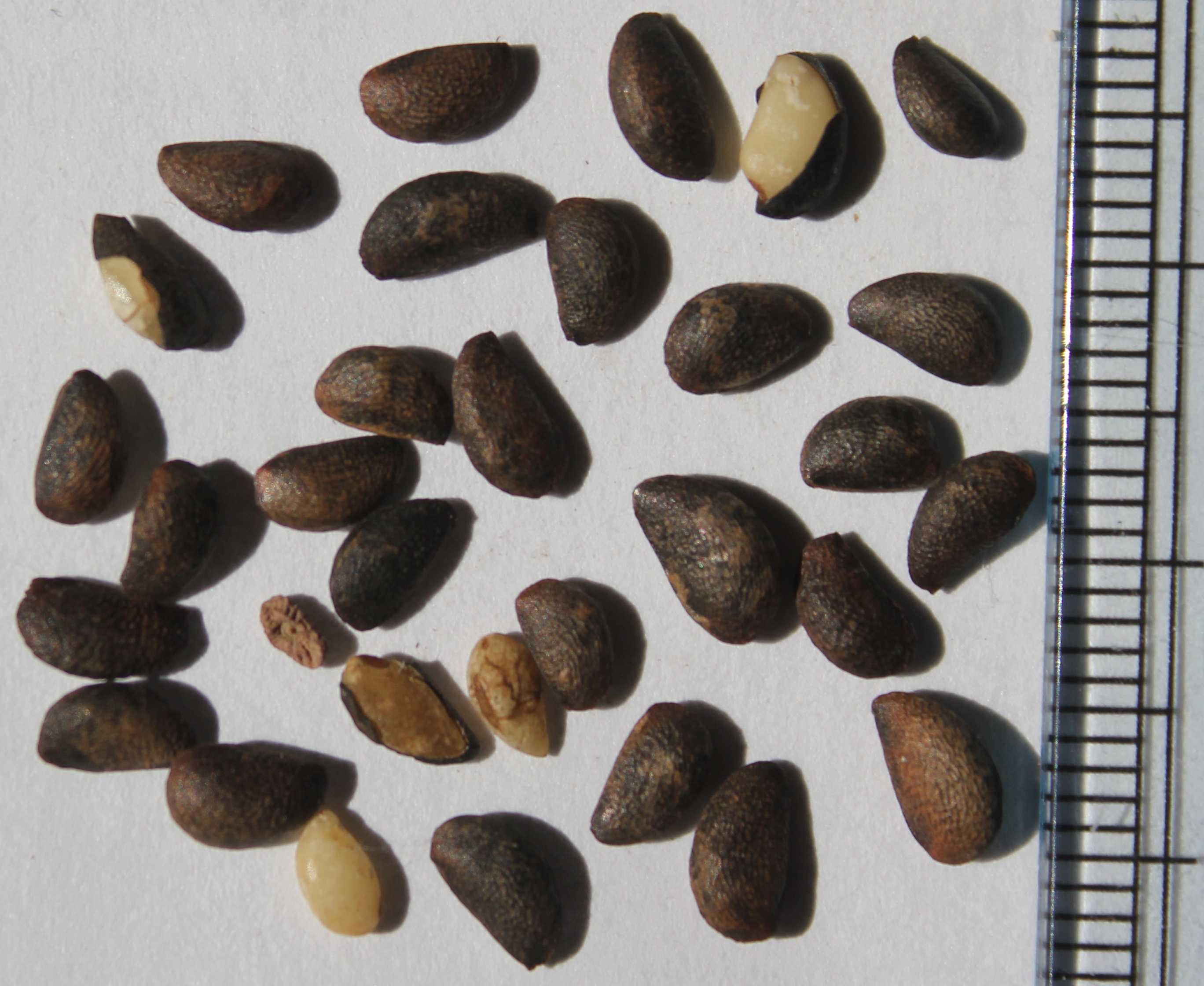
Seeds

== See also ==
- Chinese herbology 50 fundamental herbs
- Sān miáo wán
