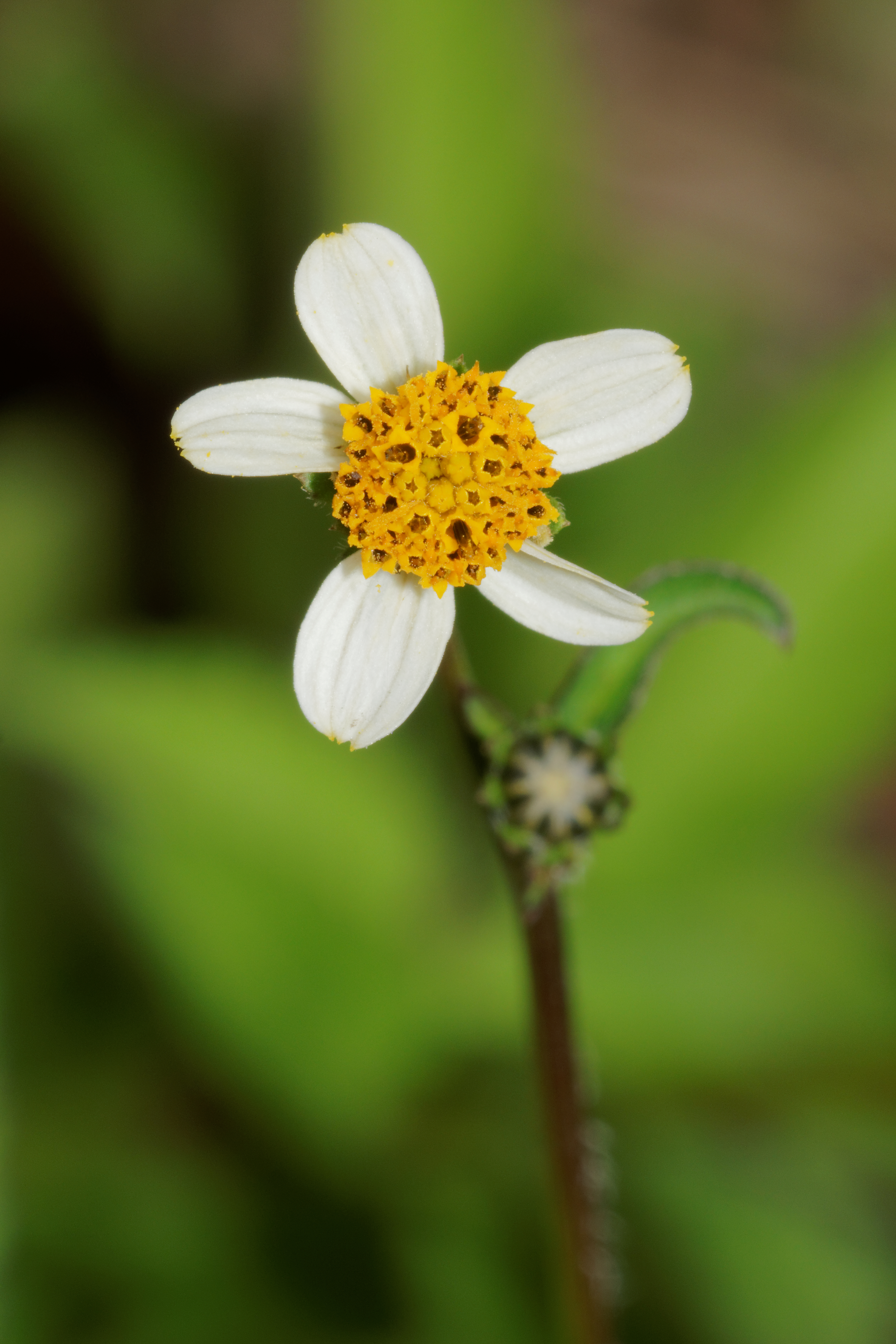

Scientific classification
- Kingdom: Plantae
- Clade: Embryophytes
- Clade: Tracheophytes
- Clade: Angiosperms
- Clade: Eudicots
- Clade: Asterids
- Order: Asterales
- Family: Asteraceae
- Genus: Bidens
- Species: B. pilosa

Binomial name
- Bidens pilosa L. 1753

Synonyms
- Synonymy: Bidens abadiae DC.; Bidens adhaerescens Vell.; Bidens africana Klatt; Bidens alausensis Kunth; Bidens alba (L.) DC.; Bidens arenaria Gand.; Bidens arenicola Gand.; Bidens aurantiaca Colenso; Bidens barrancae M.E.Jones; Bidens bimucronata Turcz.; Bidens bonplandii Sch.Bip.; Bidens brachycarpa DC.; Bidens calcicola Greenm.; Bidens californica DC.; Bidens cannabina Lam.; Bidens caracasana DC.; Bidens caucalidea DC.; Bidens chilensis DC.; Bidens ciliata Hoffmanns. ex Fisch. & C.A.Mey.; Bidens daucifolia DC.; Bidens deamii Sherff; Bidens decussata Pav. ex DC.; Bidens decussata Pav. ex Steud.; Bidens dichotoma Desf. ex DC.; Bidens exaristata DC.; Bidens hirsuta Nutt. 1841 not Sw. 1788; Bidens hirta Jord.; Bidens hispida Kunth; Bidens hybrida Thuill.; Bidens inermis S.Watson; Bidens leucantha (L.) Willd.; Bidens leucantha Poepp. ex DC.; Bidens leucanthemus (L.) E.H.L.Krause; Bidens minor (Wimm. & Grab.) Vorosch.; Bidens minuscula H.Lév. & Vaniot; Bidens montaubani Phil.; Bidens odorata Cav.; Bidens orendainae M.E.Jones; Bidens orientalis Velen. ex Bornm.; Bidens paleacea Vis.; Bidens pinnata Noronha; Bidens pumila (Retz.) Steud.; Bidens ramosissima Sherff; Bidens reflexa Link; Bidens rosea Sch.Bip.; Bidens scandicina Kunth; Bidens striata Schott ex Sweet; Bidens sundaica Blume; Bidens taquetii H.Lév. & Vaniot; Bidens trifoliata Norona; Bidens valparadisiaca Colla; Bidens viciosoi Pau; Ceratocephalus pilosus Rich. ex Cass.; Coreopsis alba L.; Coreopsis corymbifolia Buch.-Ham. ex DC.; Coreopsis leucantha L.; Coreopsis leucorrhiza Lour.; Coreopsis multifida DC.; Coreopsis odorata Poir.; Coreopsis odorata Lam.; Glossogyne chinensis Less.; Kerneria dubia Cass.; Kerneria pilosa (L.) Lowe; Kerneria tetragona Moench

= Bidens pilosa =

Species of flowering plant in the daisy family

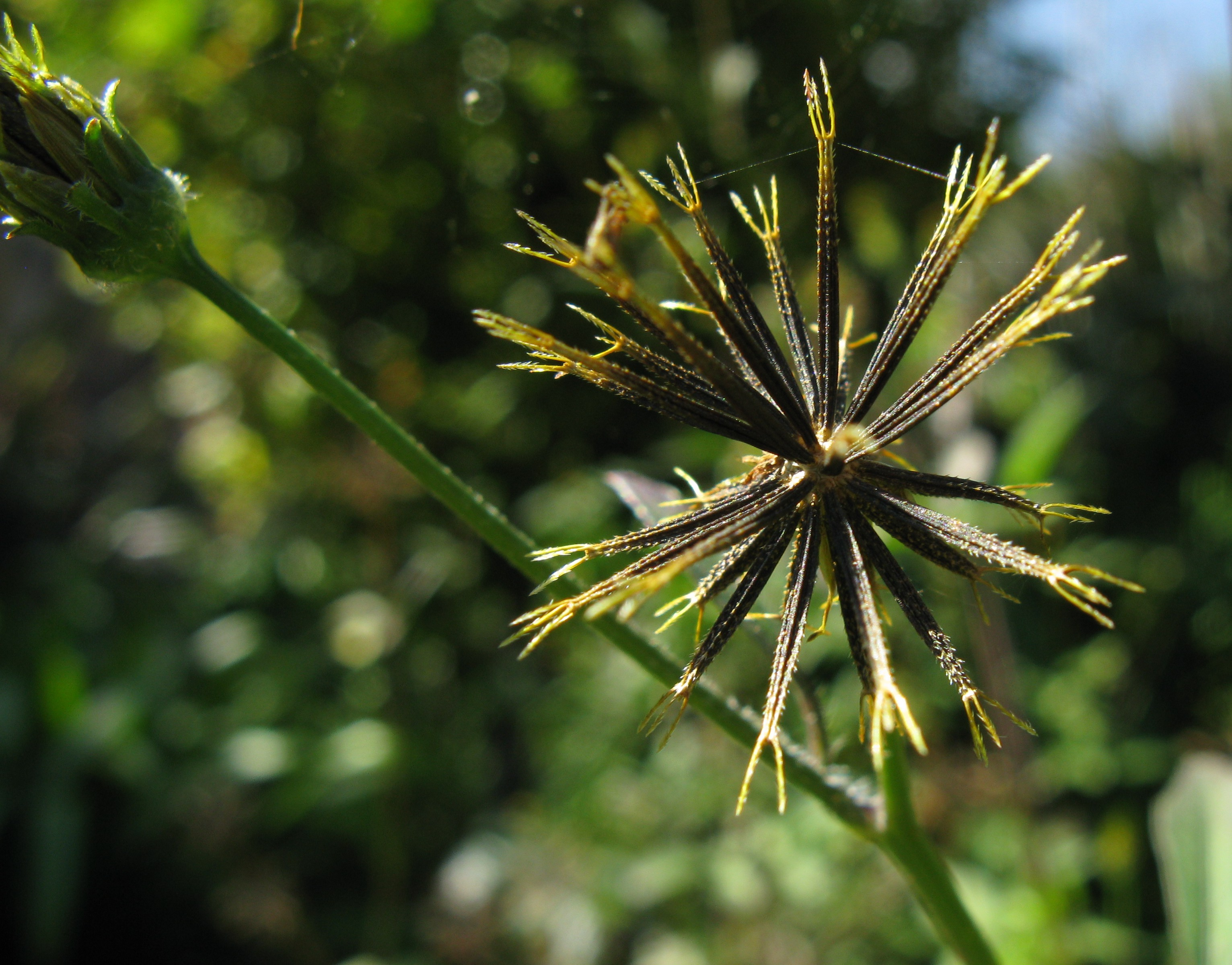
Immature fruiting head

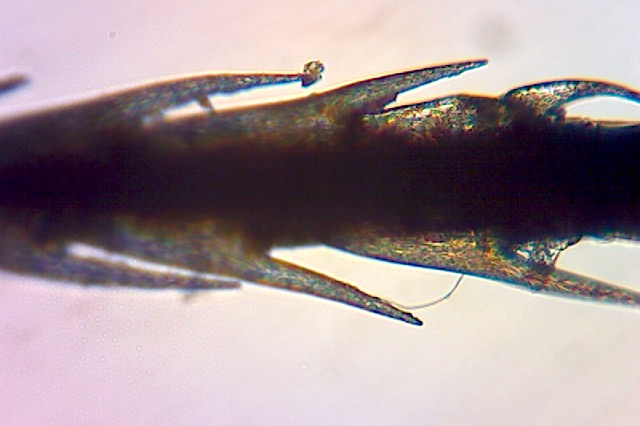
Barbs on awn of Bidens pilosa

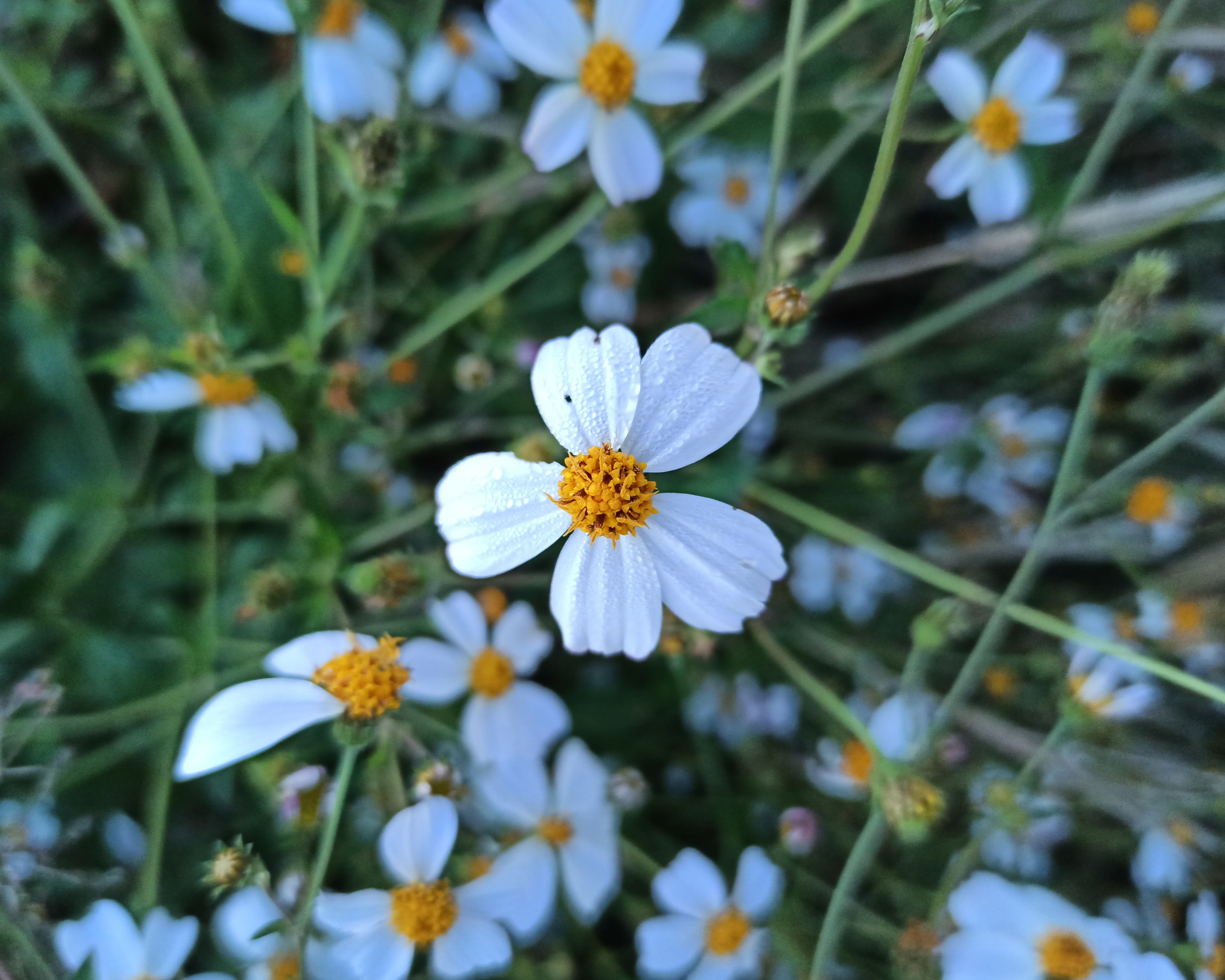
Inflorescences

Bidens pilosa is an annual species of herbaceous flowering plant in the daisy family Asteraceae. Its many common names include hitch hikers, black-jack, beggarticks, farmer's friends and Spanish needle, but most commonly referred to as cobblers pegs. It is native to the Americas but is widely distributed as an introduced species in other regions including Eurasia, Africa, Australia, South America and the Pacific Islands, and is classified as an invasive species in some regions of the world.

== Description ==
Bidens pilosa is a branched annual forb of gracile habit, growing up to 1.8 meters (5 ft 11 in) tall. It grows aggressively on disturbed land and often becomes weedy. The leaves are all oppositely arranged and range from simple to pinnate in form, the upper leaves with three to five dentate, ovate-to-lanceolate leaflets. The petioles are slightly winged.

The plant may flower at any time of the year, but mainly in summer and autumn in temperate regions. The flowers are small heads borne on relatively long peduncles. The heads consist of about four or five broad white ray florets (ligules), surrounding many tubular yellow disc florets without ligules that develop into barbed fruits.

The fruits are slightly curved, stiff, rough black rods, tetragonal in cross section, about 1 cm long, typically with two to three stiff, heavily barbed awns at their distal ends.

The infructescences form stellate spherical burrs about one to two centimeters in diameter. The barbed spines of the achenes get stuck in the feathers, fur, fleeces, clothing, or any other parts of people or animals that brush against the plant. It is an effective means of seed dispersal by zoochory, as the fruits are transported by animals.

This mechanism has helped the plant become a noxious weed in temperate and tropical regions. It is susceptible to hand weeding if small enough. Even then it must be bagged, and thick mulches may prevent it from growing.

== Distribution ==
The species is native to tropical America, widely naturalized throughout the warm temperate and tropical regions of the world. A weed of gardens, woodlands and waste areas.

== Common names ==
Its many English common names include black-jack, beggarticks, hairy beggarticks, cobbler's pegs, devil's needles, hairy bidens, Spanish needle, farmers friend, devil's pitchfork, hitch hikers and sticky beaks.

== Uses ==
Although Bidens pilosa is primarily considered a weed, in many parts of the world it is also a source of food and alternative medicine. The leaves have a resinous flavor and are eaten raw or in stews or dried for storage. In eastern Africa it is used for medicinal purposes to treat wounds. Extracts from Bidens pilosa are used in southern Africa for malaria.

During the Vietnam War, soldiers adopted the herb as a vegetable, which led to it being known as the "soldier vegetable".

== Chemistry ==
Almost 200 compounds have been isolated from B. pilosa, especially polyacetylenes and flavonoids. The plant contains ethyl caffeate, a hydroxycinnamic acid.

== See also ==
- Metallophyte
