= Γ-Fagarine =

γ-Fagarine

Names
- Systematic IUPAC name 4,8-dimethoxyfuro[2,3-b]quinoline

Identifiers
CAS Number	524-15-2
3D model (JSmol)	Interactive image
PubChem CID	107936
UNII	GKS8Q870TY
CompTox Dashboard (EPA)	DTXSID20200409
- InChI: InChI=1S/C13H11NO3/c1-15-10-5-3-4-8-11(10)14-13-9(6-7-17-13)12(8)16-2/h3-7H,1-2H3 Key: KFBCTNNQFGONHB-UHFFFAOYSA-N
- SMILES: COC1=CC=CC2=C1N=C3C(=C2OC)C=CO3

Properties
Chemical formula	C_{13}H_{11}NO_{3}
Molar mass	229.235 g·mol^{−1}
- Except where otherwise noted, data are given for materials in their standard state (at 25 °C [77 °F], 100 kPa). Infobox references

γ-Fagarine (gamma-Fagarine) is a furoquinoline alkaloid found in numerous plant species, including some used in herbal medicine such as Huáng bǎi (黃栢), one of the fifty fundamental herbs of traditional Chinese medicine. Studies in vitro have shown it to exhibit mutagenic, anti-malaria, anti-cancer and antiviral properties, but it is unclear what role it plays in the medicinal uses of these plants due to the complex mixture of phytochemicals found alongside it.

== See also ==
- Allocryptopine (α-Fagarine)
- Skimmianine (β-Fagarine)
