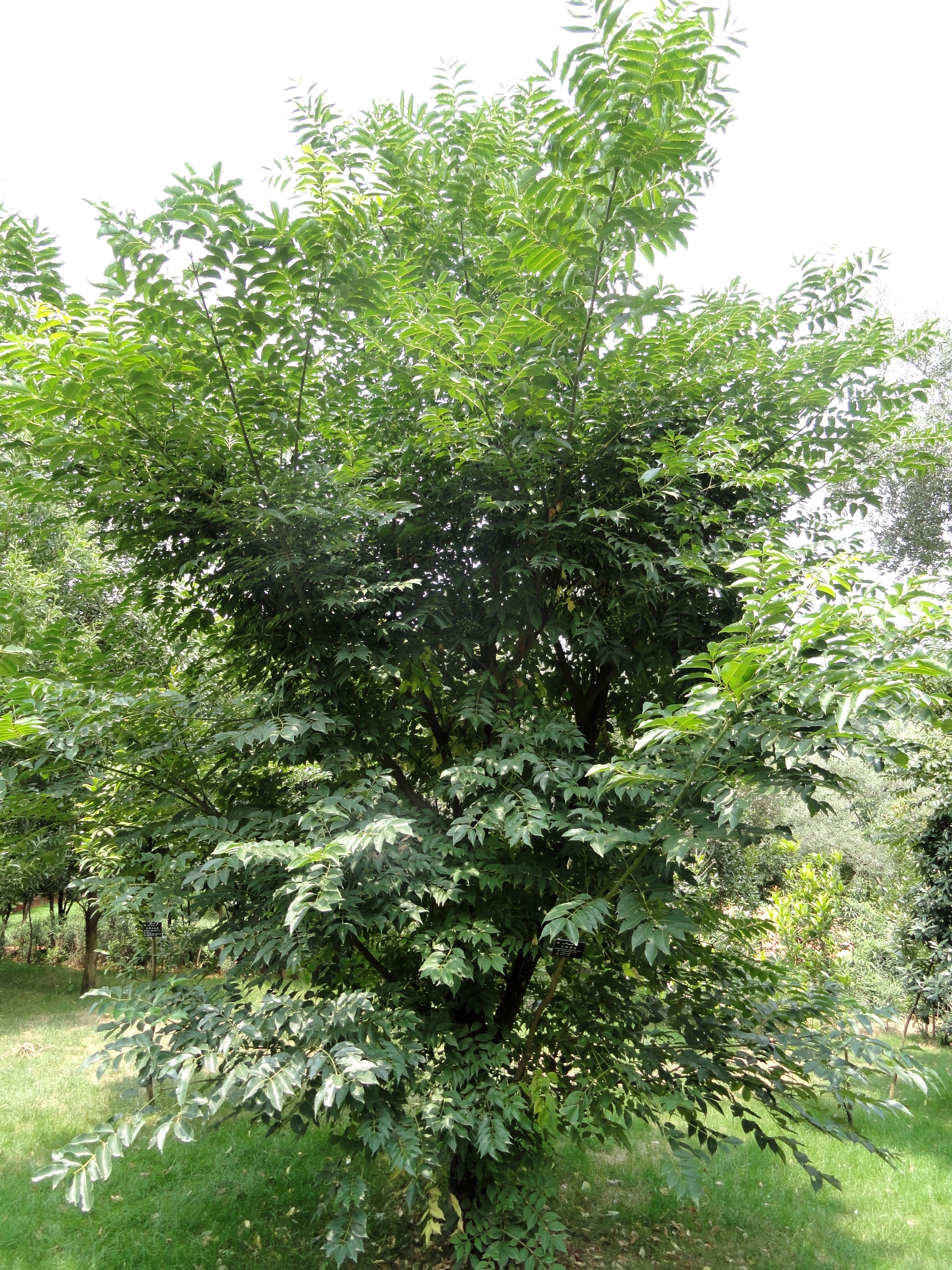
- Phellodendron chinense var. yunnanensis

Scientific classification
- Kingdom: Plantae
- Clade: Tracheophytes
- Clade: Angiosperms
- Clade: Eudicots
- Clade: Rosids
- Order: Sapindales
- Family: Rutaceae
- Genus: Phellodendron
- Species: P. chinense

Binomial name
- Phellodendron chinense C.K.Schneid. Illustriertes Handbuch der Laubholzkunde ... Jena 2:126. 1907

Subspecies
- P. c. var. glabriusculum

= Phellodendron chinense =

Species of flowering plant

Phellodendron chinense is a plant species in the genus Phellodendron.

The isocoumarin derivative 3-acetyl-3,4-dihydro-5,6-dimethoxy-1H-2-benzopyran-1-one can be found in Huáng bǎi (P. chinense), one of the fifty fundamental herbs of traditional Chinese medicine.

== See also ==
- Huáng bǎi
- Sān miáo wán
