= Berberine =

Quaternary ammonium cation

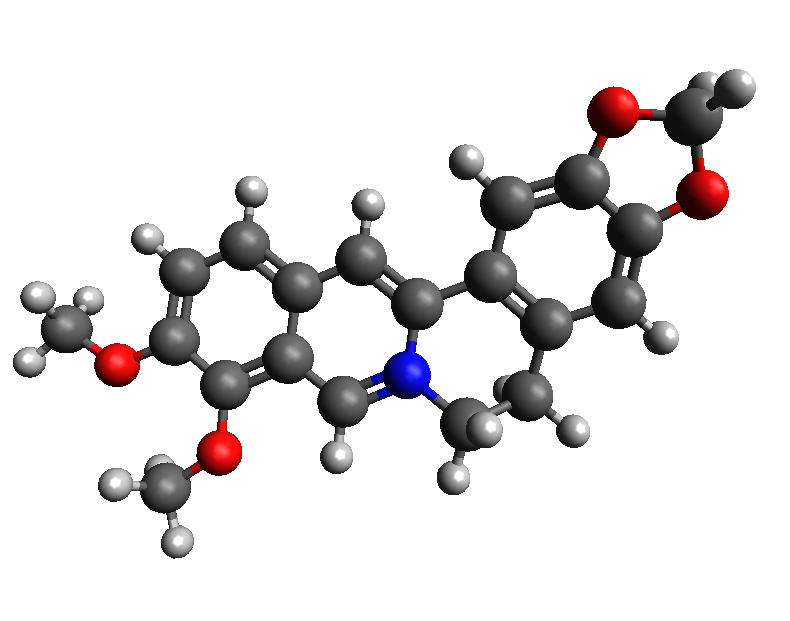

Names
- IUPAC name 9,10-Dimethoxy-7,8,13,13a-tetradehydro-2′H-[1,3]dioxolo[4′,5′:2,3]berbin-7-ium
- Systematic IUPAC name 9,10-Dimethoxy-5,6-dihydro-2H-7λ^{5}-[1,3]dioxolo[4,5-g]isoquinolino[3,2-a]isoquinolin-7-ylium
- Other names Umbellatine; 5,6-Dihydro-9,10-dimethoxybenzo[g]-1,3-benzodioxolo[5,6-a]quinolizinium; 7,8,13,13a-Tetradehydro-9,10-dimethoxy-2,3-(methylenedioxy)berbinium

Identifiers
CAS Number	2086-83-1
3D model (JSmol)	Interactive image
Beilstein Reference	3570374
ChEBI	CHEBI:16118
ChEMBL	ChEMBL12089
ChemSpider	2263
DrugBank	DB04115
ECHA InfoCard	100.016.572
EC Number	218-229-1
KEGG	C00757
PubChem CID	2353
UNII	0I8Y3P32UF
CompTox Dashboard (EPA)	DTXSID9043857
- InChI: InChI=1S/C20H18NO4/c1-22-17-4-3-12-7-16-14-9-19-18(24-11-25-19)8-13(14)5-6-21(16)10-15(12)20(17)23-2/h3-4,7-10H,5-6,11H2,1-2H3/q+1 Key: YBHILYKTIRIUTE-UHFFFAOYSA-N; InChI=1/C20H18NO4/c1-22-17-4-3-12-7-16-14-9-19-18(24-11-25-19)8-13(14)5-6-21(16)10-15(12)20(17)23-2/h3-4,7-10H,5-6,11H2,1-2H3/q+1 Key: YBHILYKTIRIUTE-UHFFFAOYAJ
- SMILES: O1c2c(OC1)cc5c(c2)c4cc3ccc(OC)c(OC)c3c[n+]4CC5

Properties
Chemical formula	C_{20}H_{18}NO_{4}^{+}
Molar mass	336.366 g·mol^{−1}
Appearance	Yellow solid
Melting point	145 °C (293 °F; 418 K)
Solubility in water	Slowly soluble
- Except where otherwise noted, data are given for materials in their standard state (at 25 °C [77 °F], 100 kPa). verify (what is ?) Infobox references

Berberine is an organic compound classified as benzylisoquinoline alkaloid. Chemically, it is a quaternary ammonium compound.

Its name is derived from the genus of plants, Berberis. Berberine occurs in the roots, bark, stems, and leaves of Berberis vulgaris (barberry), Berberis aristata (tree turmeric), Mahonia aquifolium (Oregon grape), and Hydrastis canadensis (goldenseal).

Due to their yellow pigmentation, raw Berberis materials were once commonly used to dye wool, leather, and wood. Under ultraviolet light, berberine shows a strong yellow fluorescence. As a natural dye, berberine has a color index of 75160.

Plants containing berberine have been used in traditional medicine, and berberine extracts are sold as dietary supplements. Other than in China as an over-the-counter drug, berberine is not approved as a prescription drug, regulated, or proven safe in any country.

== Biological sources ==
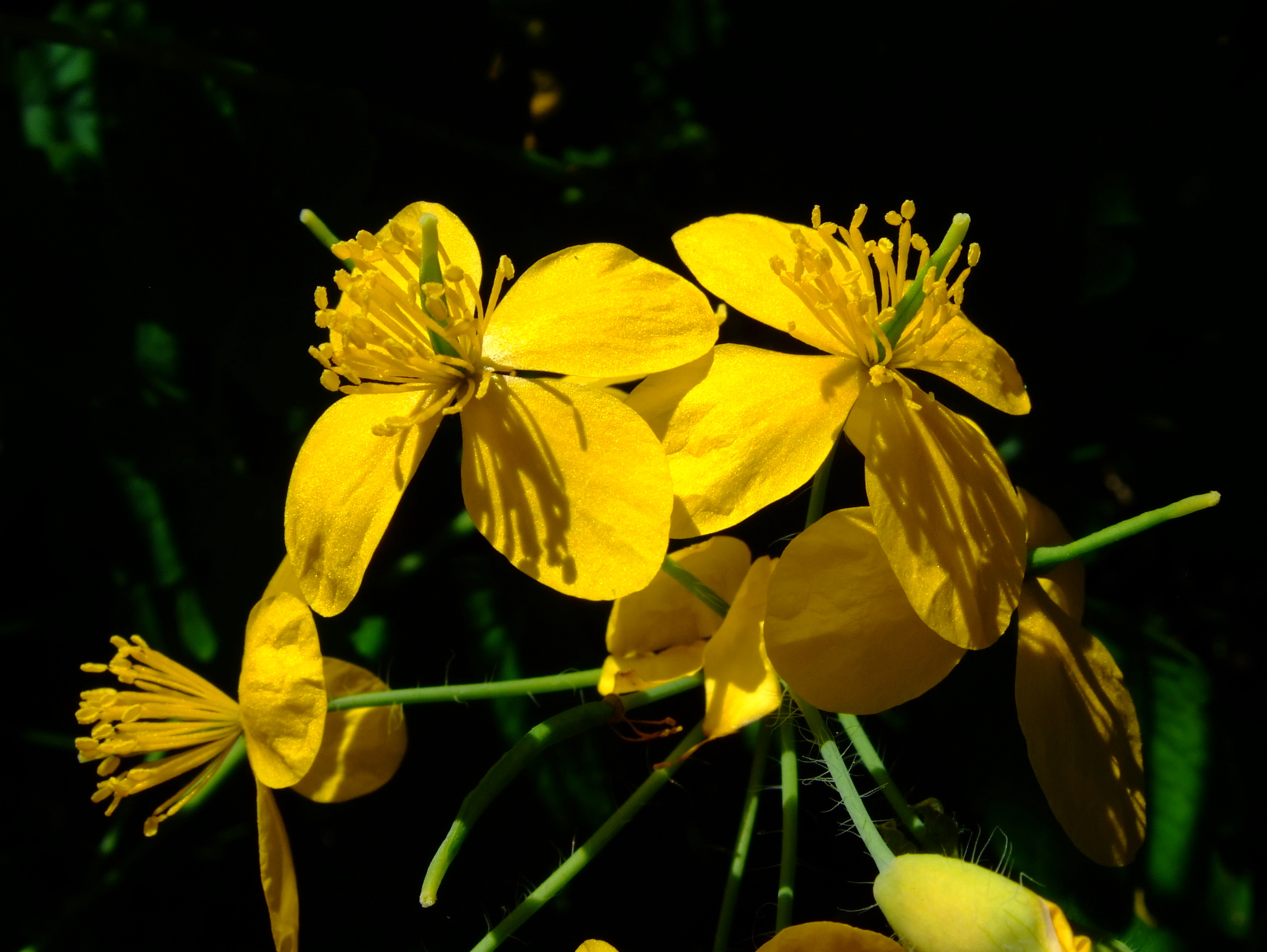
Berberine is the yellow color of celandine poppies.

The following plants are biological sources of berberine:

- Berberis vulgaris (barberry)
- Berberis aristata (tree turmeric)
- Berberis thunbergii
- Fibraurea tinctoria
- Mahonia aquifolium (Oregon grape)
- Hydrastis canadensis (goldenseal)
- Xanthorhiza simplicissima (yellowroot)
- Phellodendron amurense (Amur cork tree)
- Coptis chinensis (Chinese goldthread)
- Tinospora cordifolia
- Argemone mexicana (prickly poppy)
- Eschscholzia californica (California poppy)

Berberine is usually found in the roots, rhizomes, stems, and bark.

== Structure and biosynthesis ==
Early stages in berberine biosynthesis

Middle stages in berberine biosynthesis

Berberine has a tetracyclic skeleton as is common for alkaloids classified as a benzylisoquinoline alkaloid. The overall skeleton is derived from two equivalents of L-tyrosine. L-Tyrosine is the precursor to L-DOPA and 4-hydroxyphenylacetaldehyde.

The incorporation of an extra carbon atom as a bridge is distinctive. Formation of the berberine bridge is rationalized as an oxidative process in which the N-methyl group, supplied by S-adenosyl methionine, is oxidized to an iminium ion, and a cyclization to the aromatic ring occurs by virtue of the phenolic group.

Reticuline is a precursor to some protoberberine alkaloids in plants.

== Reactions ==
Pyrolysis of berberine gives "berberrubine", which protonates to "protoberberine".

Upon heating to 190 °C, berberine demethylates, giving berberrubine. Alkylation of the resulting zwitterion gives access to many berberine-like derivatives.

== Research ==
Although plants containing berberine are used in traditional medicine, it has higher bioavailability in its berberine HCL form, indicating limited biological activity in vivo, with no patents issued for its use as a drug. Clinical research investigating the use of berberine in humans is limited. Although numerous clinical trials have been conducted or are underway, as of 2025, berberine has frequently been withdrawn as a drug candidate and is not approved as a prescription drug in any country.

A 2023 review concluded that berberine may improve lipid concentrations. High-quality, large clinical studies would be required to properly evaluate the effectiveness and safety of berberine in various health conditions.

== Safety ==
=== Adverse effects ===
Longer-term human clinical trials have reported flatulence and diarrhea as common issues.

=== Drug interactions ===
Berberine is known to inhibit the activity of CYP3A4, an enzyme important to drug metabolism and clearance of endogenous substances, including steroid hormones such as cortisol, progesterone, and testosterone. Several studies have demonstrated that berberine can increase the concentrations of cyclosporine in renal transplant patients and midazolam in healthy adult volunteers, confirming its inhibitory effect on CYP3A4.

== Regulation ==
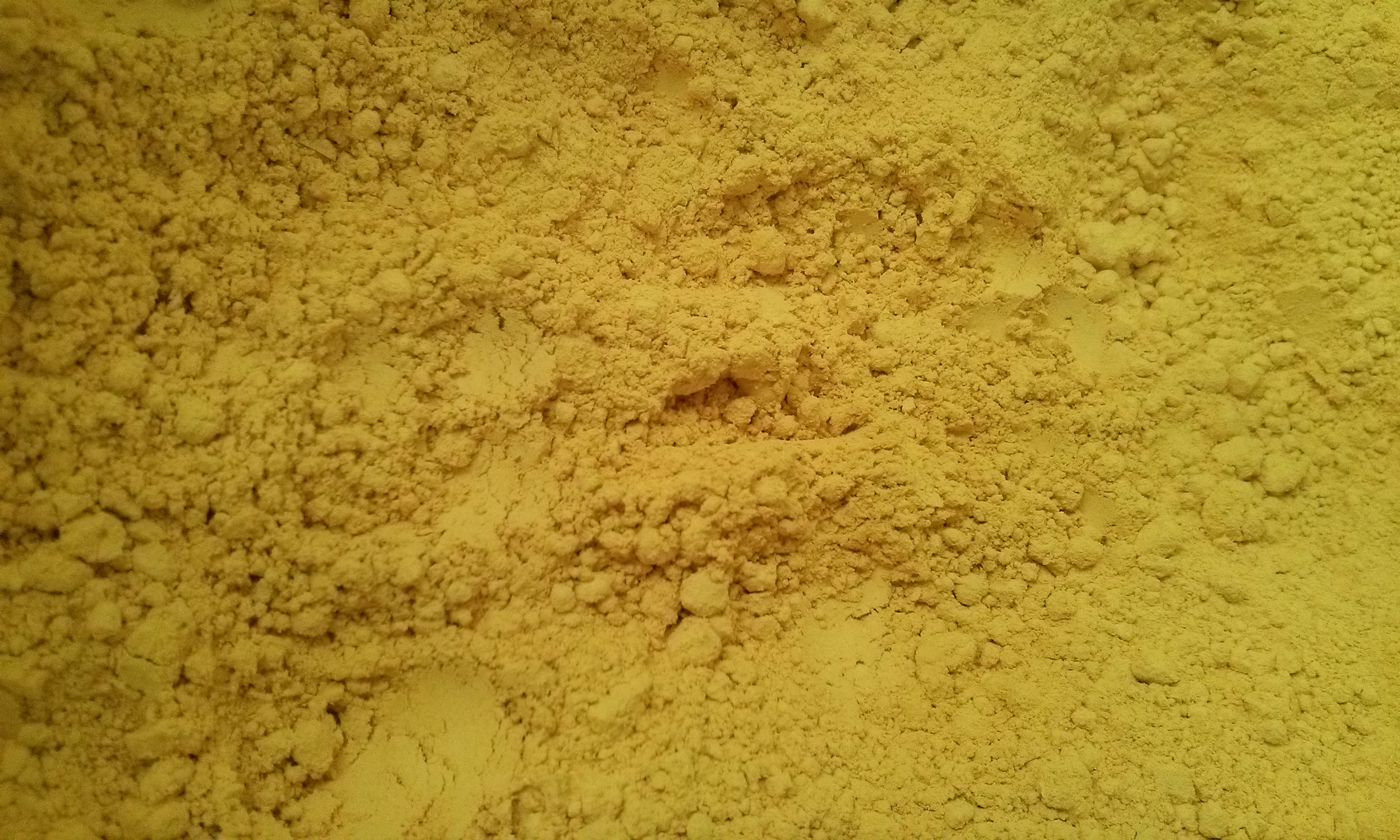
Berberine powder

=== China ===
Berberine is approved in China as an over-the-counter drug for diarrhea treatment, with the package insert claiming efficacy against E. coli and Shigella spp.

The Chinese package insert contraindicates berberine for people with hemolytic anemia and with glucose-6-phosphate dehydrogenase deficiency (G6PD deficiency). The insert also specifically precautions its use in children with G6PD deficiency because it can produce hemolytic anemia and jaundice.

=== United States ===
Although widely available, dietary supplements have not been approved in the United States for any specific medical use. The quality of berberine supplements can vary across brands; a 2017 study found that out of 15 different products sold, only six contained at least 90% of the specified berberine quantity.

From 2020 to 2022, the US Food and Drug Administration issued warning letters to eight manufacturers of berberine dietary supplements for false advertising and misbranded drug products. In the United States, berberine is not generally recognized as safe (GRAS).
