= Jatrorrhizine =

Names
- IUPAC name 3-Hydroxy-2,9,10-trimethoxy-7,8,13,13a-tetradehydroberbin-7-ium
- Systematic IUPAC name 3-Hydroxy-2,9,10-trimethoxy-5,6-dihydro-7λ^{5}-isoquinolino[3,2-a]isoquinolin-7-ylium
- Other names: Jateorrhizine; Neprotin; Jatrochizine; Jatrorhizine; Yatrorizine

Identifiers
CAS Number	3621-38-3
3D model (JSmol)	Interactive image
ChEBI	CHEBI:6087
ChEMBL	ChEMBL251055
ChemSpider	65269
ECHA InfoCard	100.020.744
EC Number	222-817-3
KEGG	C09553
PubChem CID	72323
UNII	091S1F8V5Q
CompTox Dashboard (EPA)	DTXSID40189767
- InChI: InChI=1S/C20H19NO4/c1-23-18-5-4-12-8-16-14-10-19(24-2)17(22)9-13(14)6-7-21(16)11-15(12)20(18)25-3/h4-5,8-11H,6-7H2,1-3H3/p+1 Key: MXTLAHSTUOXGQF-UHFFFAOYSA-O; InChI=1S/C20H19NO4/c1-23-18-5-4-12-8-16-14-10-19(24-2)17(22)9-13(14)6-7- 21(16)11-15(12)20(18)25-3/h4-5,8-11H,6-7H2,1-3H3/p+1 Key: MXTLAHSTUOXGQF-UHFFFAOYSA-O; InChI=1/C20H19NO4/c1-23-18-5-4-12-8-16-14-10-19(24-2)17(22)9-13(14)6-7-21(16)11-15(12)20(18)25-3/h4-5,8-11H,6-7H2,1-3H3/p+1 Key: MXTLAHSTUOXGQF-IKLDFBCSAC
- SMILES: COC1=C(C2=C[N+]3=C(C=C2C=C1)C4=CC(=C(C=C4CC3)O)OC)OC

Properties
Chemical formula	C_{20}H_{20}NO_{4}^{+1}
Molar mass	338.382 g·mol^{−1}
- Except where otherwise noted, data are given for materials in their standard state (at 25 °C [77 °F], 100 kPa). verify (what is ?) Infobox references

Jatrorrhizine is a protoberberine alkaloid found in some plant species, such as Enantia chlorantha (Annonaceae). Synonyms that may be encountered include jateorrhizine, neprotin, jatrochizine, jatrorhizine, and yatrorizine.

== Bioactive effects ==
Jatrorrhizine has been reported to have antiinflammatory effect, and to improve blood flow and mitotic activity in thioacetamide-traumatized rat livers. It was found to have antimicrobial and antifungal activity. It binds and noncompetitively inhibits monoamine oxidase (IC_{50} = 4 μM for MAO-A and 62 μM for MAO-B) It interferes with multidrug resistance by cancer cells in vitro when exposed to a chemotherapeutic agent. Large doses (50–100 mg/kg) reduced blood sugar levels in mice by increasing aerobic glycolysis.

Derivatives of jatrorrhizine (notably 3-alkoxy derivatives, and specifically 3-octyloxy 8-alkyljatrorrhizine derivatives such as 3-octyloxy 8-butyljatrorrhizine) have been synthesized and found to have much stronger antimicrobial effects.
