= Canadine =

- (S)-(-)-canadine

Names
- IUPAC name 9,10-Dimethoxy-2′H-[1,3]dioxolo[4′,5′:2,3]berbine
- Systematic IUPAC name (13aS)-9,10-Dimethoxy-5,8,13,13a-tetrahydro-2H,6H-[1,3]dioxolo[4,5-g]isoquinolino[3,2-a]isoquinoline
- Other names (S)-Tetrahydroberberine; Xanthopuccine

Identifiers
CAS Number	522-97-4
3D model (JSmol)	Interactive image
ChEMBL	ChEMBL490533
ChemSpider	19910
ECHA InfoCard	100.023.468
KEGG	C03329; C11818
PubChem CID	21171
UNII	V2SSH085X8
CompTox Dashboard (EPA)	DTXSID10110003
- InChI: InChI=1S/C20H21NO4/c1-22-17-4-3-12-7-16-14-9-19-18(24-11-25-19)8-13(14)5-6-21(16)10-15(12)20(17)23-2/h3-4,8-9,16H,5-7,10-11H2,1-2H3/t16-/m0/s1 Key: VZTUIEROBZXUFA-INIZCTEOSA-N
- SMILES: O1c2c(OC1)cc3c(c2)CCN5[C@H]3Cc4ccc(OC)c(OC)c4C5

Properties
Chemical formula	C_{20}H_{21}NO_{4}
Molar mass	339.391 g·mol^{−1}
- Except where otherwise noted, data are given for materials in their standard state (at 25 °C [77 °F], 100 kPa). Infobox references

Canadine, also known as (S)-tetrahydroberberine and xanthopuccine, is a benzylisoquinoline alkaloid (BIA), of the protoberberine structural subgroup, and is present in many plants from the family Papaveraceae, such as Corydalis yanhusuo and C. turtschaninovii.

== Biosynthesis ==
Metabolically, (S)-canadine is derived from (S)-reticuline, a pivotal intermediate in the biosynthesis of numerous BIA structural subgroups, through three enzymatic steps: 1) berberine bridge enzyme to (S)-scoulerine; 2) (S)-scoulerine 9-O-methyltransferase to (S)-tetrahydrocolumbamine; and 3) (S)-canadine synthase/CYP719A21 to (S)-canadine.

== Metabolism ==
(S)-Canadine is the immediate metabolic precursor of berberine, which is produced through the action of the enzyme tetrahydroberberine oxidase.

(S)-canadine
+ H^{+}
2 O_{2}
2 H_{2}O_{2}
berberine

It is also an intermediate in the biosynthesis of noscapine, which is likewise a benzylisoquinoline alkaloid, but of the phthalideisoquinoline structural subgroup.

(S)-Canadine, berberine, palmatine, and hydrastine are the major alkaloids present in goldenseal. In Corydalis cava, the enzyme berberine reductase converts berberine back to canadine but as the (R) enantiomer of the product.

berberine
+ 2 NADPH
2 H^{+}
2 H^{+}
(R)-canadine
+ 2 NADP^{+}

This type of inversion of stereochemistry allows both enantiomers of some alkaloids to be present in this species.

The enzyme (S)-tetrahydroprotoberberine N-methyltransferase characterised from Eschscholtzia californica converts (S)-canadine to (S)-cis-N-methylcanadine. The methyl group comes from the cofactor, S-adenosyl methionine (SAM).

(S)-canadine
+ SAM
(S)-cis-N-methylcanadine
+ SAH

== Effects ==
A number of in vitro effects of (S)-canadine have been reported. It stimulates myogenesis and inhibits muscle protein degradation. (S)-Canadine blocks K(ATP) channels in dopamine neurons. (S)-Canadine has displayed antioxidant activity: though it lacked any demonstrable cytotoxic effect in three unique cell cultures, it was observed to possess antioxidant activity against free radical-induced oxidative injury. (S)-Canadine can block voltage-dependent calcium channels, but at a level significantly lower than that of verapamil.

== CPU 86017 ==
CPU 86017 [149088-32-4]

Canadine is also used in the synthesis of CPU 86017 (a novel Class III antiarrhythmic agent with multiple actions at ion channels).
