= Corydalis filistipes =

Conservation status
- Vulnerable (IUCN 3.1)

Scientific classification
- Kingdom: Plantae
- Clade: Tracheophytes
- Clade: Angiosperms
- Clade: Eudicots
- Order: Ranunculales
- Family: Papaveraceae
- Genus: Corydalis
- Species: C. filistipes

Binomial name
- Corydalis filistipes (Carl von Linné)Takenoshin Nakai

Species of flowering plant in the poppy family

Corydalis filistipes is a perennial flowering plant in the family Papaveraceae. It is found only on Ulleung Island in North Gyeongsang Province, South Korea. It is listed as vulnerable on the IUCN Red List of Threatened Species.

== Description ==
The plant grows to a height of 40 cm (16 in), and the tuber diameter reaches 3 cm (1.2 in)

It has to 2–3 stem leaves split up 3 times into 2–3 pieces. The first leaf splits into 3 pieces. The lobe is in the acute phase and splits into 3 pieces while the final lobe form is lance or line lance. The surface is green. The back side is grayish blue.

Blooming occurs in May. The flowers are 11 mm (0.43 in) long and light purple, in an inflorescence that reaches 7–15 cm (2.8–5.9 in) in length. The corolla or calyx protruding backward is 5 mm long. The bract is a lanceolate shape with a length of 1–3 cm, but it gradually becomes smaller. The peduncle is 3–8 cm (1.2–3.1 in) long and has no hair.

The fruit is flat, lanceolate, narrow-ended, and 1.8–2 cm (0.71–0.79 in) long with a stigma on the end. The seed is 3 mm long and has no hairs, a black streak, and a white-spotted head.

It has one main stem and 2–3 scales at the bottom, among which the large scales are 2.5–4 cm (1.0–1.6 in) long, and the lower part covers the main stem.

The tuber is yellow and 2–3 cm (0.8–1.2 in) in diameter.

== Uses ==
The tubers are occasionally used medicinally. The root tuber of Corydalis yanhusuo, Corydalis turtschaninovii for. Fumariaefolia, Corydalis ambigua, Corydalis filistipes, Corydalis ternata, Corydalis turtschaninovii var. linearis is called Corydalis turtschaninowii and is used medicinally.

Extracted alkaloid by tuber is almost 11. corydaline, tetrahydropalmatine, conadine, protopine, tetrahydrocoptisine, isocorypalmine, corybulbine, β-homochelidonene, coptisine, dehydrocorydaline, l-coryclamine, dehydrocorydalmine

Its effects include analgesia, soothing, calming, contraction of the uterus, and increased blood circulation. It is used to treat dysmenorrhea, menstrual irregularities, abdominal pain due to postpartum hemorrhaging, complications of postpartum hemorrhaging, back and knee pain, and bruising.
