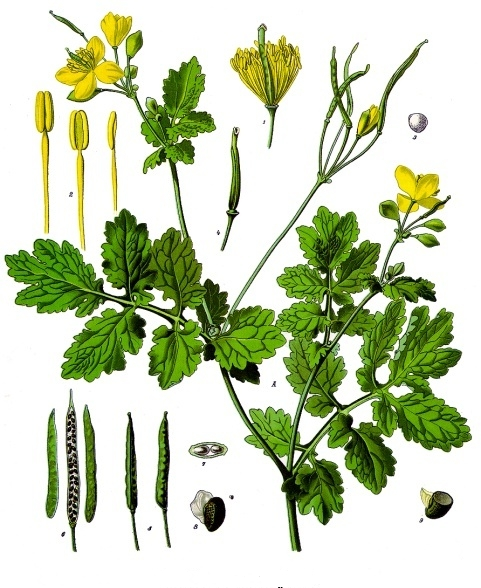

Scientific classification
- Kingdom: Plantae
- Clade: Tracheophytes
- Clade: Angiosperms
- Clade: Eudicots
- Order: Ranunculales
- Family: Papaveraceae
- Tribe: Chelidonieae
- Genus: Chelidonium
- Species: C. majus

Binomial name
- Chelidonium majus L.

Synonyms
- Chelidonium cavaleriei H.Lév.; Chelidonium dahuricum DC.; Chelidonium grandiflorum DC.; Chelidonium haematodes Moench; Chelidonium laciniatum Mill.; Chelidonium luteum Gilib. nom. inval.; Chelidonium murale P.Renault; Chelidonium olidum Tarscher. ex Ott; Chelidonium quercifolium Willemet; Chelidonium ruderale Salisb.; Chelidonium umbelliferum Stokes

= Chelidonium majus =

Species of flowering plant in the poppy family

Chelidonium majus, the greater celandine, is a perennial herbaceous flowering plant in the poppy family Papaveraceae. One of two species in the genus Chelidonium, it is native to Europe and western Asia and introduced widely in North America.

The plant known as lesser celandine (Ficaria verna) is not closely related, as it belongs to the buttercup family Ranunculaceae.

== Description ==
Greater celandine is a perennial herbaceous plant with an erect habit, and reaches 30–120 cm (12–47 in) high. The blue-green leaves are pinnate with lobed and wavy margins, up to 30 cm (12 in) long. When injured, the plant exudes a yellow to orange latex.

The flowers consist of four yellow petals, each about 18 mm (0.71 in) long, with two sepals. A double-flowered variety occurs naturally. The flowers appear from late spring to summer, May to September (in the UK), in umbelliform cymes of about four flowers.

The seeds are small and black, borne in a long, cylindrical capsule. Each has an elaiosome, which attracts ants to disperse the seeds (myrmecochory).

== Taxonomy and naming ==
Chelidonium majus was described by Carl Linnaeus in volume one of his Species Plantarum in 1753. It is classified in the genus Chelidonium within the wider family Papaveraceae. It has two accepted subspecies.

- Chelidonium majus subsp. grandiflorum – Native to Siberia, China, and Korea
- Chelidonium majus subsp. majus – Native to Europe, western Asia, and a small area of North Africa

There are a total of 29 synonyms of its two subspecies including eleven species names.

Table of Synonyms
Name	Year	Rank	Synonym of:	Notes
Chelidonium cavaleriei H.Lév.	1915	species	subsp. grandiflorum	= het.
Chelidonium dahuricum DC.	1824	species	subsp. grandiflorum	= het.
Chelidonium grandiflorum (DC.) DC.	1824	species	subsp. grandiflorum	≡ hom.
Chelidonium haematodes Moench	1794	species	subsp. majus	= het.
Chelidonium laciniatum Mill.	1768	species	subsp. majus	= het.
Chelidonium laciniatum var. fumariifolium DC.	1821	variety	subsp. majus	= het.
Chelidonium luteum Gilib.	1782	species	subsp. majus	= het., opus utique oppr.
Chelidonium majus f. acutilobum Fast	1953	form	subsp. majus	= het.
Chelidonium majus var. crenatum Fr.	1824	variety	subsp. majus	= het.
Chelidonium majus var. crenatum Fr.	1828	variety	subsp. majus	= het.
Chelidonium majus var. fumariifolium (DC.) W.D.J.Koch	1833	variety	subsp. majus	= het.
Chelidonium majus var. grandiflorum DC.	1821	variety	subsp. grandiflorum	≡ hom.
Chelidonium majus lusus grandiflorum Wein ex A.Zobel	1909	sport	subsp. majus	= het., nom. illeg.
Chelidonium majus subsp. laciniatum (Mill.) Arcang.	1882	subspecies	subsp. majus	= het.
Chelidonium majus var. laciniatum (Mill.) Martyn	1795	variety	subsp. majus	= het.
Chelidonium majus f. laciniatum Schube	1913	form	subsp. majus	= het.
Chelidonium majus var. pleniflorum Lawalrée	1955	variety	subsp. majus	= het., nom. illeg.
Chelidonium majus f. pleniflorum W.F.Christ.	1922	form	subsp. majus	= het.
Chelidonium majus var. plenum H.R.Wehrh.	1930	variety	subsp. majus	= het.
Chelidonium majus var. quercifolium (Willemet) Mérat	1812	variety	subsp. majus	= het.
Chelidonium majus f. quercifolium (Willemet) Fast	1953	form	subsp. majus	= het.
Chelidonium majus f. serratum Fast	1953	form	subsp. majus	= het.
Chelidonium majus var. tenuifolium Retz.	1779	variety	subsp. majus	= het.
Chelidonium majus var. tenuifolium Lilj.	1792	variety	subsp. majus	= het., nom. illeg.
Chelidonium murale P.Renault	1804	species	subsp. majus	= het.
Chelidonium olidum Tarscher. ex Ott	1851	species	subsp. majus	= het.
Chelidonium quercifolium Willemet	1805	species	subsp. majus	= het.
Chelidonium ruderale Salisb.	1796	species	subsp. majus	= het.
Chelidonium umbelliferum Stokes	1812	species	subsp. majus	= het.
Notes: ≡ homotypic synonym ; = heterotypic synonym

The name celandine comes from Late Latin celidonia, from earlier Latin chelidonia or chelidonium, and ultimately from Ancient Greek χελιδόνιον, from χελιδών (chelidṓn) 'swallow', hence the common name swallowwort. Ancient writers said that the flower bloomed when the swallows returned and faded when they left. Chelidonium majus has also been called great celandine, nipplewort, tetterwort, or simply celandine. The common name tetterwort also refers to Sanguinaria canadensis.

== Distribution and habitat ==
Chelidonium majus is native to most regions of Europe. It is also found in North Africa in Macaronesia, Algeria and Morocco. In Western Asia it is found in the Caucasus, Armenia, Azerbaijan, Georgia, Kazakhstan, Mongolia, Siberia, Iran and Turkey. Its habitats include rocky slopes, woodlands, waste areas and roadsides.

== Ecology ==
It is considered an aggressive invasive plant in parts of North America and an invasive plant in other areas. In Wisconsin, for example, it is a restricted plant. Control is obtained mainly via pulling or spraying the plant before seed dispersal.

== Commercial uses ==
The yellow sap of plant is used in small quantities for a yellow-orange craft dye, and as an imitation gold paint.

== Constituents and pharmacology ==
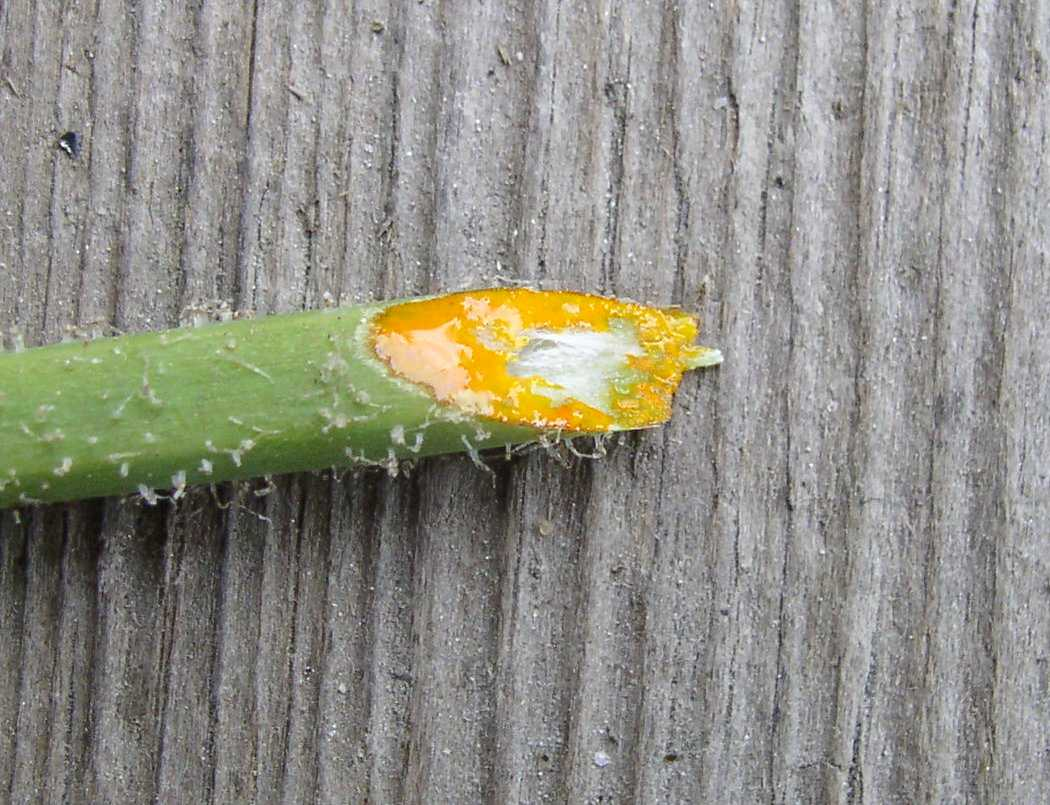
A cut stem exuding yellow latex

The whole plant is toxic in moderate doses as it contains a range of isoquinoline alkaloids; use in herbal medicine requires the correct dose. The main alkaloid present in the herb and root is coptisine. Other alkaloids present include methyl 2'-(7,8-dihydrosanguinarine-8-yl)acetate, allocryptopine, stylopine, protopine, cryptopine, hemochelidonine, homochelidonine, norchelidonine, berberine, chelidonine, sanguinarine, chelerythrine and 8-hydroxydihydrosanguinarine. Sanguinarine is particularly toxic with an LD_{50} of 18 mg per kg body weight (IP in rats). Caffeic acid derivatives, such as caffeoylmalic acid, are also present.

The characteristic latex also contains proteolytic enzymes and the phytocystatin chelidostatin, a cysteine protease inhibitor. It is a traditional folk remedy against warts in France, German-speaking countries, Hungary, and the UK. It is used in the preparation of a range of off-the-shelf treatments for warts and skin conditions.

Chelidonium is used to make Ukrain, a drug that has been promoted for the treatment of cancer and viral infections but is not known to be effective.

The fresh herb is no longer used officially. No dose-finding studies exist and the reported clinical studies are characterised by a considerable heterogeneity.

Except for homeopathic medicines, the drug is no longer used in most English-speaking countries. In Germany, Austria and Switzerland, extracts of Chelidoni herba are a controversial component of the gastric remedy Iberogast. The OTC-preparation is a top-selling product for the company Bayer, which is now under investigation for not warning consumers of possible hepatotoxic side-effects when taking the drug. Elevated liver-enzymes and toxic hepatitis with a documented fatality have been reported.

The plant is poisonous to chickens.

== Herbalism ==
The aerial parts and roots of greater celandine are used in herbalism. The above-ground parts are gathered during the flowering season and dried at high temperatures. The root is harvested in autumn between August and October and dried. The fresh rhizome is also used. Celandine has a hot and bitter taste. Preparations are made from alcoholic and hot aqueous extractions. The related plant bloodroot has similar chemical composition and uses to greater celandine.

As far back as Pliny the Elder and Dioscorides (1st century CE), this herb has erroneously been seen as a detoxifying agent. The root has been chewed to relieve toothache. John Gerard's Herball (1597) states that "the juice of the herbe is good to sharpen the sight, for it cleanseth and consumeth away slimie things that cleave about the ball of the eye and hinder the sight and especially being boiled with honey in a brasen vessell."

It was formerly used by some Romani people as a foot refresher; modern herbalists use its purgative properties. The modern herbalist Juliette de Baïracli Levy recommended greater celandine diluted with milk for the eyes and the latex for getting rid of warts. Chelidonium was a favourite herb of the French herbalist Maurice Mességué. Chelidonium majus has traditionally been used for treatment of various inflammatory diseases including atopic dermatitis. It is also traditionally used in the treatment of gallstones and dyspepsia.

The Haudenosaunee give an infusion of the whole plant, another plant and milk to pigs that drool and exhibit sudden movements.

It was also once used to treat liver disorders, owing to the juice's resemblance to bile. However, ingesting plant may actually lead to hepatotoxicity.

== Gallery ==
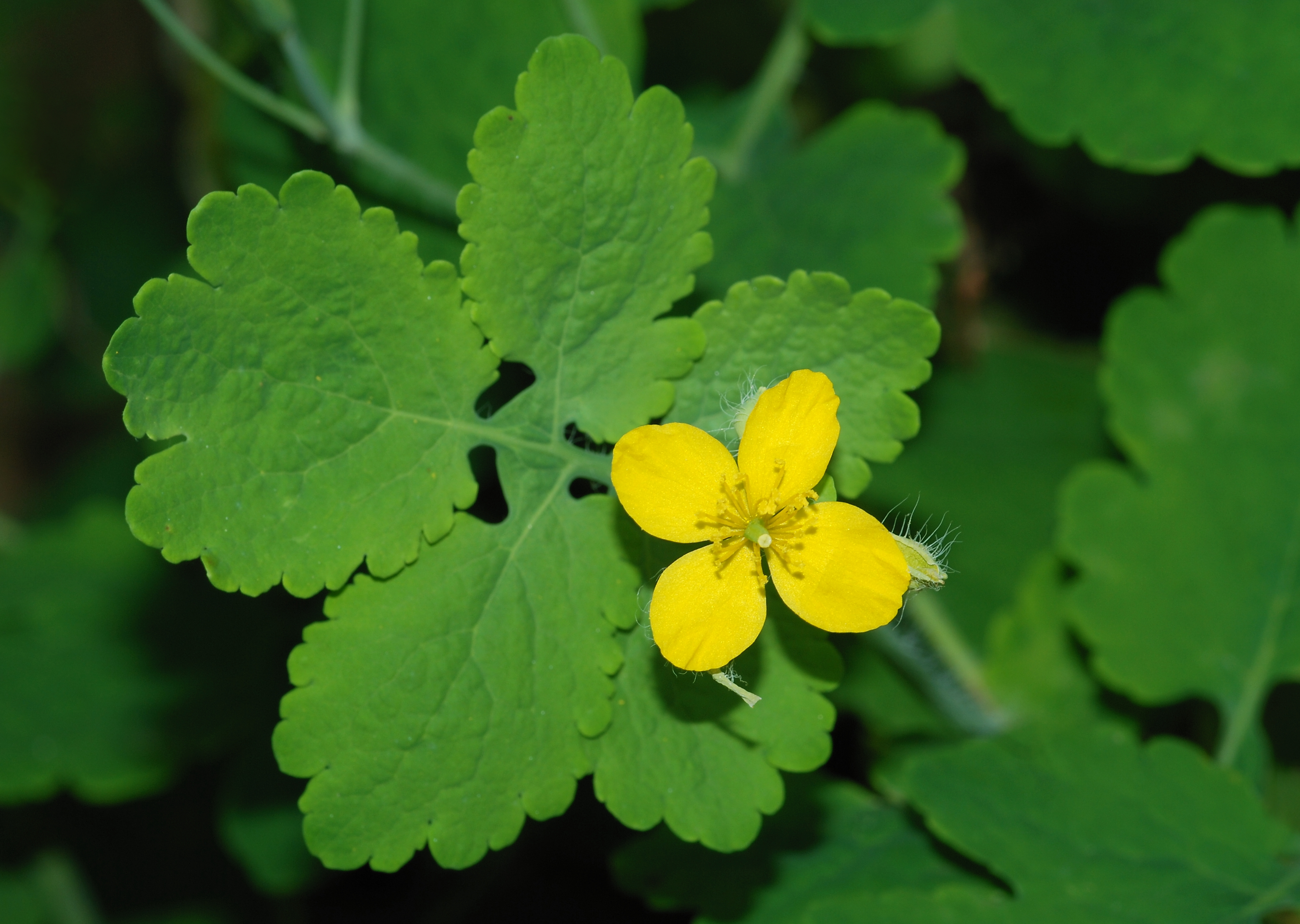
A leaf and an open flower

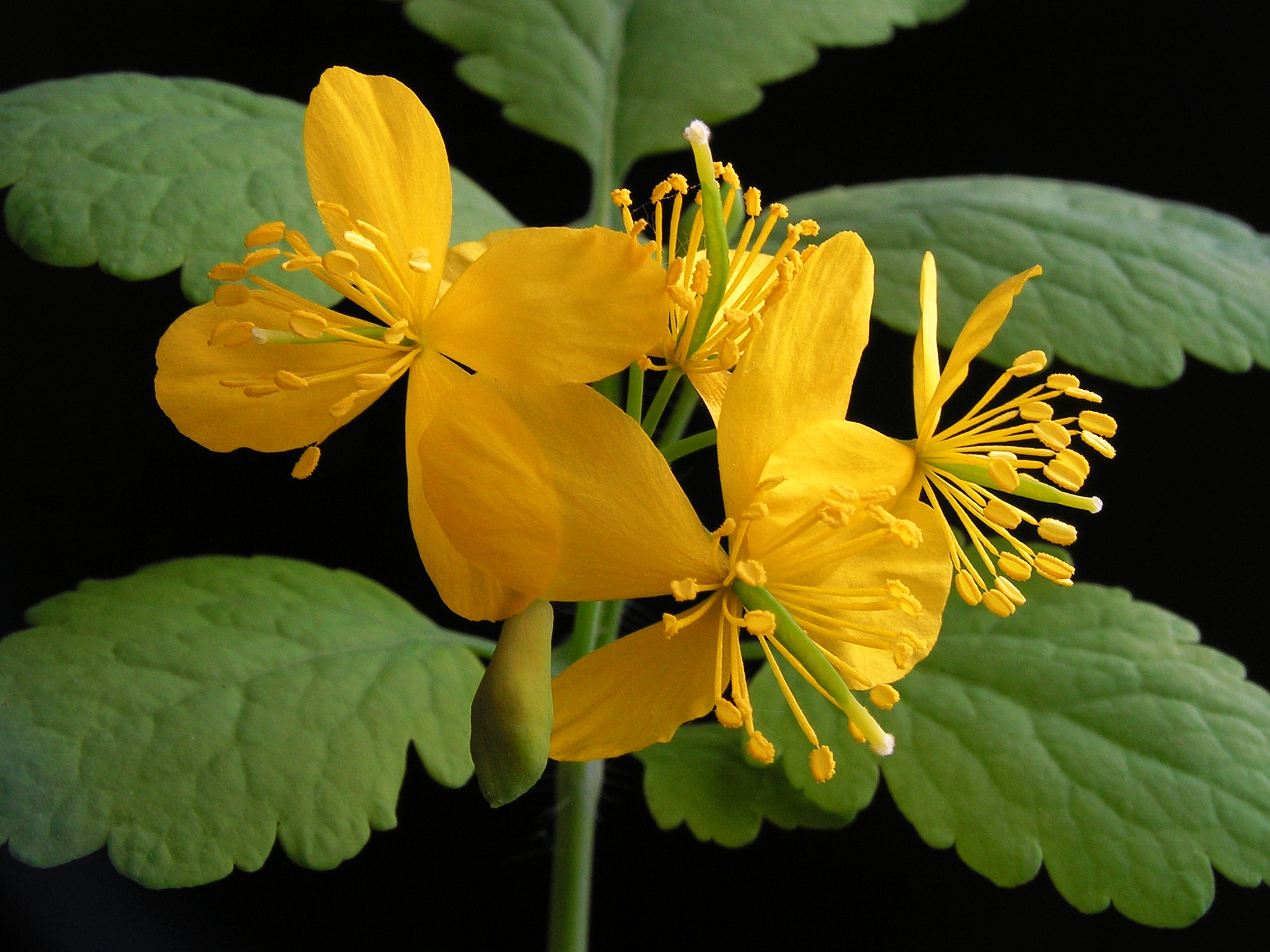
Flowers

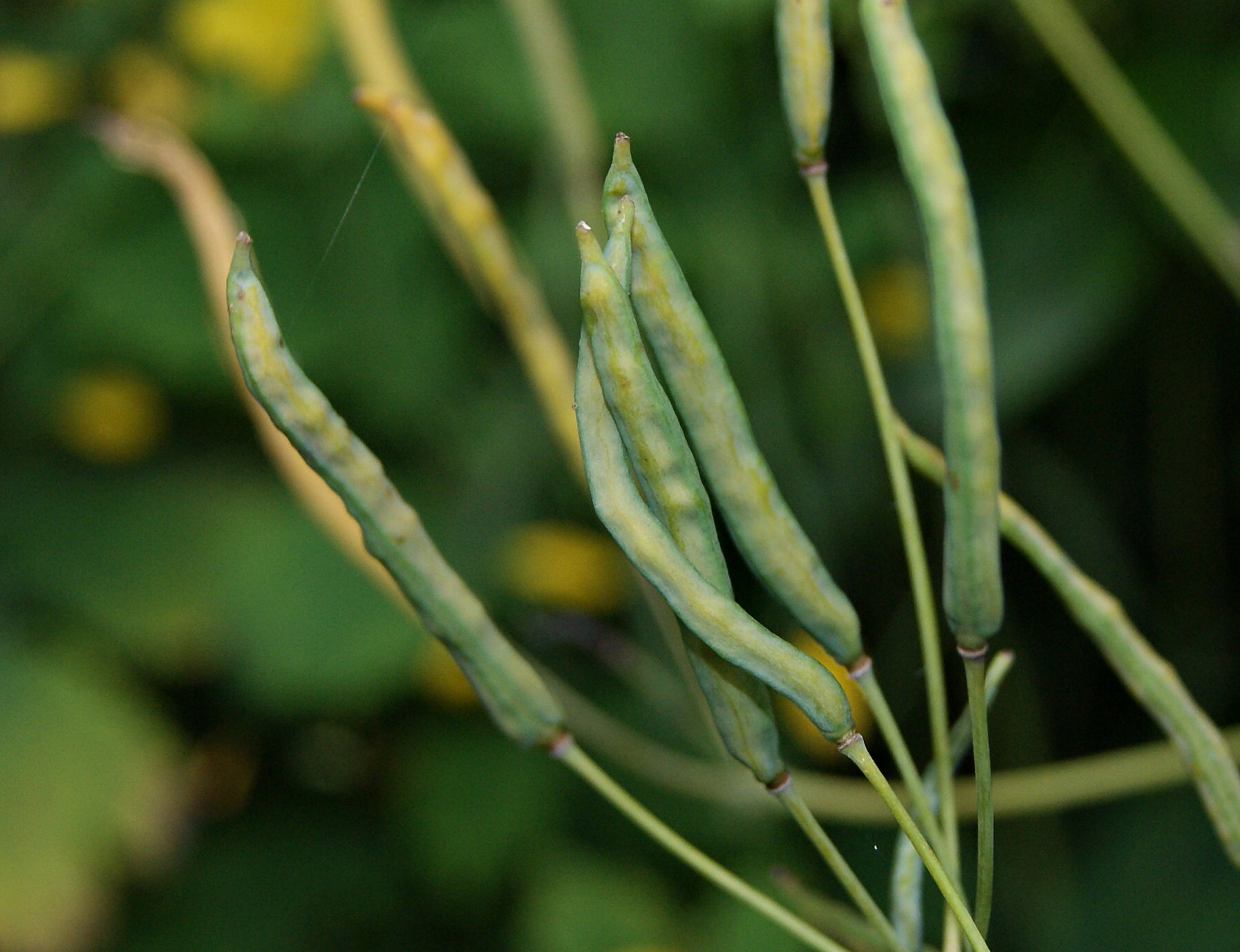
Fruits
