= Cheilanthifoline =

Names
- IUPAC name 2-Methoxy-2′H-[1,3]dioxolo[4′,5′:9,10]berbin-3-ol
- Systematic IUPAC name (6aS)-9-Methoxy-6,6a,11,14-tetrahydro-2H,12H-[1,3]dioxolo[4,5-h]isoquinolino[2,1-b]isoquinolin-8-ol
- Other names (S)-Cheilanthifoline

Identifiers
CAS Number	483-44-3
3D model (JSmol)	Interactive image
ChEBI	CHEBI:16233
ChemSpider	389481
KEGG	C05174
PubChem CID	440582
CompTox Dashboard (EPA)	DTXSID70964044
- InChI: InChI=1S/C19H19NO4/c1-22-18-7-12-4-5-20-9-14-11(2-3-17-19(14)24-10-23-17)6-15(20)13(12)8-16(18)21/h2-3,7-8,15,21H,4-6,9-10H2,1H3/t15-/m0/s1 Key: FVXCQULKSPVRPK-HNNXBMFYSA-N
- SMILES: COC1=C(C=C2[C@@H]3CC4=C(CN3CCC2=C1)C5=C(C=C4)OCO5)O

Properties
Chemical formula	C_{19}H_{19}NO_{4}
Molar mass	325.364 g·mol^{−1}
Melting point	184 °C (363 °F; 457 K)
- Except where otherwise noted, data are given for materials in their standard state (at 25 °C [77 °F], 100 kPa). Infobox references

(S)-Cheilanthifoline is a benzylisoquinoline alkaloid (BIA) which has been isolated from Corydalis cheilanthifolia and Argemone mexicana. It is derived from (S)-reticuline, a pivotal intermediate in the biosynthesis of numerous BIAs. (S)-cheilanthifoline is the immediate precursor of the BIA (S)-stylopine ((S)-stylopine synthase/CYP719A20), which is the precursor for the alkaloids protopine and sanguinarine.

== Biosynthesis ==
Cheilanthifoline is produced from the benzylisoquinoline alkaloid, scoulerine, by the enzyme (S)-cheilanthifoline synthase.

scoulerine

+ NADPH
O_{2}
2 H_{2}O

cheilanthifoline

+ NADP^{+}

Scoulerine is one of the products derived from (S)-reticuline.

== Metabolism ==
Cheilanthifoline is the precursor to other alkaloids. For example, (S)-stylopine (also known as tetrahydrocoptisine) is produced when the enzyme (S)-stylopine synthase forms a second methylenedioxy ring:

cheilanthifoline

+ NADPH
O_{2}
2 H_{2}O

(S)-stylopine

+ NADP^{+}
