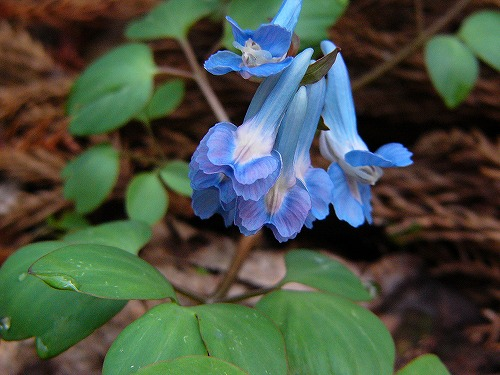

Scientific classification
- Kingdom: Plantae
- Clade: Tracheophytes
- Clade: Angiosperms
- Clade: Eudicots
- Order: Ranunculales
- Family: Papaveraceae
- Genus: Corydalis
- Species: C. ambigua

Binomial name
- Corydalis ambigua Cham. & Schltdl.

= Corydalis ambigua =

Species of flowering plant in the poppy family

Corydalis ambigua is a tuberous early flowering east Asian flowering plant species in the poppy family Papaveraceae. Its exact native range is obscure due to taxonomic confusion. It is one of the sources of the drug tetrahydropalmatine.

== Chemistry ==
Protopine

Corydalis ambigua contains a variety of alkaloids including corynoline, acetylcorynoline, d-corydalin, dl-tetrahydropalmatine, protopine, tetrahydrocoptisine, dl-tetrahydrocoptisine, d-corybulbine and allocryptopine.

Chemical derivatives of tetrahydroprotoberberines present in Corydalis ambigua have been studied as potential ways to increase pain tolerance and for treating drug addiction. Further, they may represent a category of neurotransmitter stabilizers which have potential use in broad range of psychotic and neurological disorders.

== Use ==
Cordyalis ambigua is part of the traditional Ainu cuisine:

The bulbs of this plant are extensively eaten by the Ainu, especially by those in the Ishikari valley, Saghalien, and Southern Kuriles. The bulb has a slightly bitter taste, which is removed by repeated boilings in water. In Etorup, the Ainu boil with a certain kind of earth to remove its bitterness. They are eaten either simply boiled or mixed with rice. In Saghalien, it is said that they are cooked generally with the fat of seals. The bulbs are often boiled and then dried for future use.

== See also ==
- Chinese herbology
