= BBE-like enzymes =

Class of enzymes

Berberine bridge enzyme-like (BBE-like enzymes) form a subgroup of the superfamily of FAD-linked oxidases (SCOPe d.58.32), structurally characterized by a typical fold observed initially for vanillyl-alcohol oxidase (VAO). This proteins are part of a multigene family (PF08031) that can be found in plants, fungi and bacteria.

BBE-like enzymes family form a large subgroup that have a special C-terminal structural element adjacent to the substrate binding region. An homonym of this family is the (S)-reticuline oxidase or berberine bridge enzyme from California poppy (Eschscholzia californica), the responsible of catalyzing the conversion of (S)-reticuline to (S)-scoulerine. This conversion is made by an oxidative ring closure reaction. The product of this reaction is the C-C bond and is referred to as the berberine bridge. Also, marks a branch point in the biosynthesis of benzylisoquinoline alkaloids.

As mentioned above, BBE-like enzymes are in the large family of FAD-linked oxidases. Regarding the structure of this particular family, they have a FAD binding module formed by the N- and C- terminal parts of the protein. There is a substrate binding module that, in collaboration with isoalloxazine ring of FAD, disposes the environment for efficient substrate binding and oxidation.

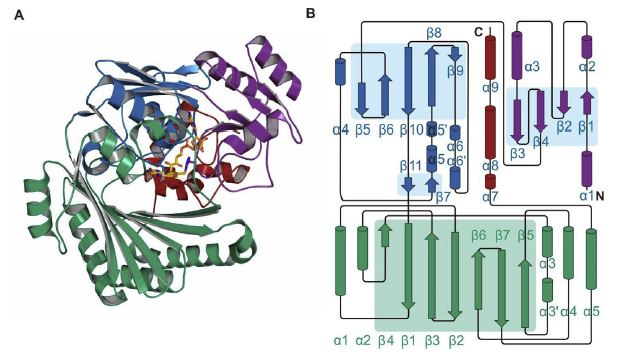
A: Structural properties of the BBE-like enzymes. Sub-domains of the upper flavin-binding module are shown in purple, blue and red. B: Secondary structure elements are in consecutively order for a-helices and b-strands in the flavin- and substrate-binding modules and are differenced in green and blue, respectively.

== Purification process ==
Cell cultures of Berberis beaniana (B. beaniana), which in this certain experiment are taken as an example, were harvested 10–12 days, contained large amounts of proto-berberines, mainly jatrorrhizine. These quaternary alkaloids have a strong inhibitory effect on the BBE, so they had to be removed. In order to eliminate most of these interfering cationic substances, the enzyme solution was treated first with carboxymethyl-Sepharose and subsequently with dextrancoated charcoal.

After that, the resulting solution was fractionated using standard procedures and generated, after isoelectric focusing, a single protein band in SDS gel electrophoresis. In the end, the obtained enzyme had been purified 450 times and contained 0.7% of the activity present in the crude extract at the beginning.

== Properties ==
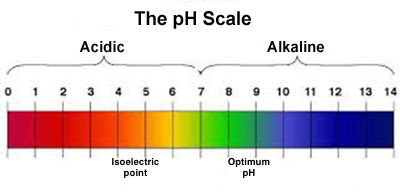
pH scale showing the BBE-like enzyme's optimum pH and isoelectric point.

The BBE-like enzyme's optimum pH is 8.9, this means it works in an alkaline medium, but the isoelectric point of the homogeneous enzyme is located at pH 4.9, which is a rather an acid medium. This value was obtained with isoelectric focusing and chromatofocusing techniques.

The enzyme broad temperature range is between 40-50 degrees Celsius. The molecular weight of the protein was determined by two processes that show two different results: by SDS gel electrophoresis comes to be 54 kD, and by gel filtration on AcA 54 the enzyme corresponds to a molecular weight of 49 kD, adopting globular shape. A purification study shows that the true molecular weight is in the range of 52 ±4 kD.

On the other hand, total activity decreases drastically during the stationary phase.

== Known functions ==
BBE-like enzymes serve as a catalyzer for a wide range of reactions. All the way from two-electron oxidations as observed in (At)BBE-like 15 to four-electron oxidations as seen in Dbv29.

BBE-like enzymes are involved in the synthesis of plenty of isoquinoline alkaloids such as the conversion of (S)-reticuline to (S)-scoulerine or by guiding (S)-reticuline to protoberberine, protopine, benzophenanthridine, phthalide isoquinoline or rhoeadine metabolic pathways.

Research on this matter is rare since it is very complex and had never been looked into until recently. New studies reveal that BBE-like enzymes are involved in the biological synthesis of the alkaloids intermediates communesin as well as chanoclavine (I). The mechanism through which reactions are catalyzed by these BBE-like enzymes has not been found yet, but the resulting conformation of the products suggests that a similar coupling of substrate oxidation and ring formation occurs in these processes.

== BBE-like enzymes in plants ==
BBE-like enzymes in plant physiology play a role in primary metabolism catalyzed by members of this family. The oxidation of a variety of alcohol groups supplies a first understanding of the origin of the BBE-like enzyme family, present in reactions like oxidation of mono and polysaccharides. It seems that they are present in a huge percentage of plants.

A common reaction of BBE-like enzymes from plants is the oxidation of carbohydrates at the anomeric center to the appropriate lactones. A member of these enzymes is hexose oxidase (HOX) from Chondrus crispus, a red algae that belongs to the division of Rhodophyta. But is more related to bacterial BBE-like enzymes than to members present in plants.

Other example of carbohydrate oxidizing BBE-like enzyme is nectarin V (Nec5) from tobacco. Its function is to convert glucose to gluconolactone. Nec5 is related with the pathogen defense system of plants, because it protects reproductive organelles.

Another function of this class of enzymes in plants is Defense response homeostasis. BBE-like enzymes play a key role as oligosaccharide oxidases, reducing the activity of olygogalacturonanes (fragments of pectin) and oligocellobiose (fragments of cellulose) as DAMPS.

== Medical applications ==
Berberine bridge enzyme (BBE) is a central enzyme in the biosynthesis of berberine, a pharmaceutically important alkaloid. The enzyme itself hasn't had extensive research carried on, and has very limited, if any, specific medical application. On the other hand, berberine is highly regarded for its interactions with several diseases. Berberine has been known to influence weight loss, and this antiobesity effect may benefit all conditions related to increased body mass such as hypertension, dyslipidemia or pre-diabetes. This may reduce the likelihood of getting sedentary diseases such as heart failure or other problems related to this issue. By being an AMPK activator like Metformin, it acts similar, affecting metabolism in a way that may reveal useful applications to treat type-2 diabetes.

Overall, this alkaloid might be useful in the treatment and study of diseases like polyendocrine metabolic ovarian syndrome (PMOS), some types of cancer, heart problems or dyslipidemia.

== Brief history ==
First discovered and named by E. Rink and H. Böhm in 1974 they were isolated in cell suspension cultures of the Papaveraceae Macleaya microcarpa.

Since then, many minor advancements have been made in this particular topic, but BBE-like enzymes, either for their lack of study, or the lack of clear indications that it might contain useful information for other scientific research, have yet to be fully worked on, and subsequently known at their full complexity.
