= C20H17NO6 =

The molecular formula C_{20}H_{17}NO_{6} (molar mass: 367.35 g/mol, exact mass: 367.1056 u) may refer to:

- Bicuculline
- Sibiricine
