= Sibiricine =

Names
- IUPAC name 8'-Hydroxy-6-methylspiro[7,8-dihydro-[1,3]dioxolo[4,5-g]isoquinoline-5,7'-8H-cyclopenta[g][1,3]benzodioxole]-6'-one

Identifiers
CAS Number	±: 64397-10-0; natural: 24181-66-6
3D model (JSmol)	Interactive image
ChEMBL	ChEMBL4176125
ChemSpider	9902999
PubChem CID	±: 632652; natural: 179410
CompTox Dashboard (EPA)	DTXSID80947000
- InChI: InChI=1S/C20H17NO6/c1-21-5-4-10-6-14-15(26-8-25-14)7-12(10)20(21)18(22)11-2-3-13-17(27-9-24-13)16(11)19(20)23/h2-3,6-7,19,23H,4-5,8-9H2,1H3/t19-,20-/m0/s1 Key: BQZZTMXCHPNTCL-PMACEKPBSA-N
- SMILES: O=C6c2c(c1OCOc1cc2)[C@H](O)[C@@]65N(C)CCc4cc3OCOc3cc45

Properties
Chemical formula	C_{20}H_{17}NO_{6}
Molar mass	367.357 g·mol^{−1}
- Except where otherwise noted, data are given for materials in their standard state (at 25 °C [77 °F], 100 kPa). Infobox references

Sibiricine is a bioactive isoquinoline alkaloid isolated from Corydalis crispa (Fumariaceae), which is a Bhutanese medicinal plant from the Himalayas.

Using high resolution mass spectrometry, the molecular formula of sibiricine is determined to be C_{20}H_{17}NO_{6}. The IUPAC name for sibiricine is 8'-hydroxy-6-methylspiro[7,8-dihydro-[1,3]dioxolo[4,5-g]isoquinoline-5,7'-8H-cyclopenta[g][1,3]benzodioxole]-6'-one. The proton nuclear magnetic resonance (PMR) spectrum of sibiricine at 100 MHz shows that sibiricine is structurally related to ochrobirine and ochotensine. With the exception of sibiricine, 8 other alkaloids are extracted by investigating Corydalis crispa. These isoquinoline alkaloids are protopine, 13-oxoprotopine, 13-oxocryptopine, stylopine, coreximine, rheagenine, ochrobirine, and bicuculline.
