= Protopine 6-monooxygenase =

Class of enzymes

protopine 6-monooxygenase

Identifiers
- EC no.: 1.14.14.98
- CAS no.: 128561-60-4

Databases
- BRENDA: enzyme data
- ExPASy: NiceZyme view
- KEGG: enzyme entry
- MetaCyc: metabolic pathway
- Rhea: reactions
- PDB structures: RCSB PDB PDBe PDBsum
- Gene Ontology: AmiGO / QuickGO
Search
- PMC: articles
- PubMed: articles
- NCBI: proteins

Protopine 6-monooxygenase (EC 1.14.14.98) is an enzyme that catalyzes the chemical reaction

Protopine

+ NADPH
O_{2}
H_{2}O

6-hydroxyprotopine

+ NADP^{+}

The three substrates of this enzyme are protopine, reduced nicotinamide adenine dinucleotide phosphate (NADPH), and oxygen. ts initial benzylisoquinoline alkaloid product is 6-hydroxyprotopine but this spontaneously forms dihydrosanguinarine. NADP^{+} and water are the by-products.

The systematic name of this enzyme class is protopine,NADPH:oxygen oxidoreductase (6-hydroxylating). It is also called protopine 6-hydroxylase.
