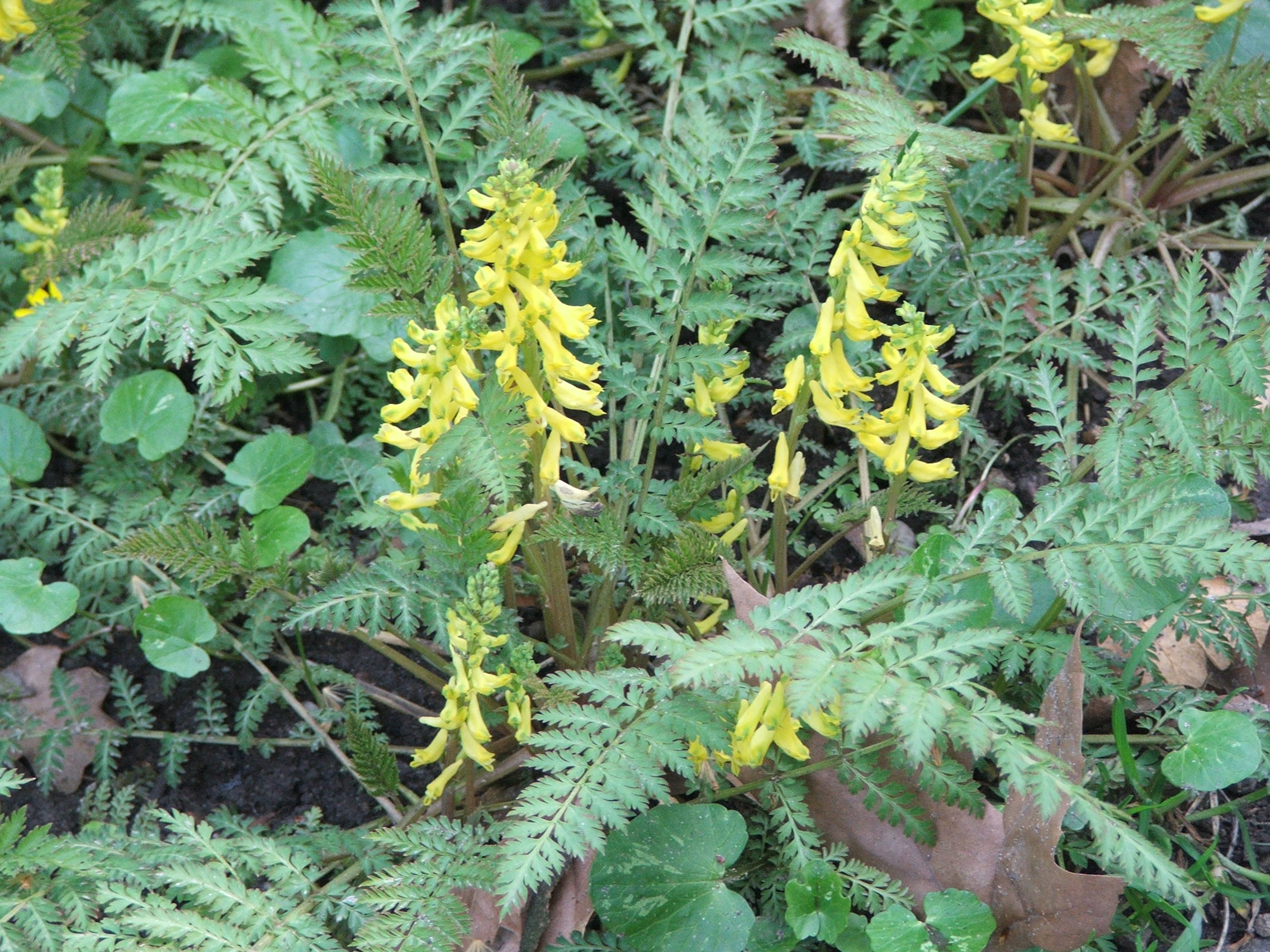
- Flowers and foliage

Scientific classification
- Kingdom: Plantae
- Clade: Tracheophytes
- Clade: Angiosperms
- Clade: Eudicots
- Order: Ranunculales
- Family: Papaveraceae
- Genus: Corydalis
- Species: C. cheilanthifolia

Binomial name
- Corydalis cheilanthifolia Hemsl.

Synonyms
- Corydalis daucifolia H.Lév. & Vaniot

= Corydalis cheilanthifolia =

Fern-leaf corydalis

Species of flowering plant in the poppy family

Corydalis cheilanthifolia, the fern-leaved corydalis or fern-leaf corydalis, is a flowering plant in the family Papaveraceae. It is a perennial growing from rhizomes, native to western and central China. It is a source of the benzylisoquinoline alkaloid, cheilanthifoline.

== Description ==
Its leaves are shaped like lipfern (Cheilanthes), for which the plant is named. They turn bronze and remain over winter. Its flowers are yellow and bloom in long upright racemes on leafless stems from mid-spring to early summer. Its Seeds with elaiosomes are borne in a long, thin pod.

== Gallery ==
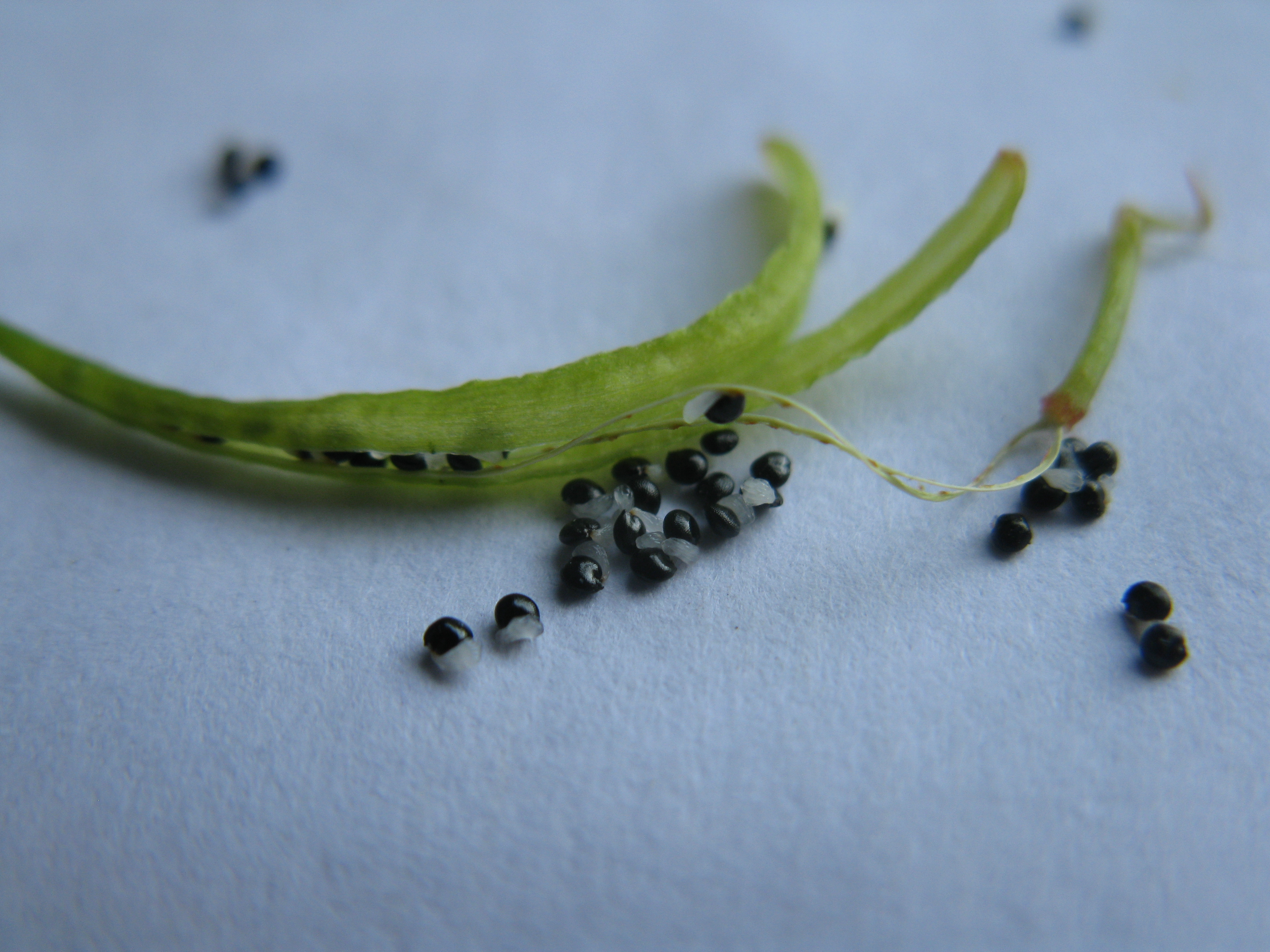
Pod and seeds with elaiosomes
