= Protopine =

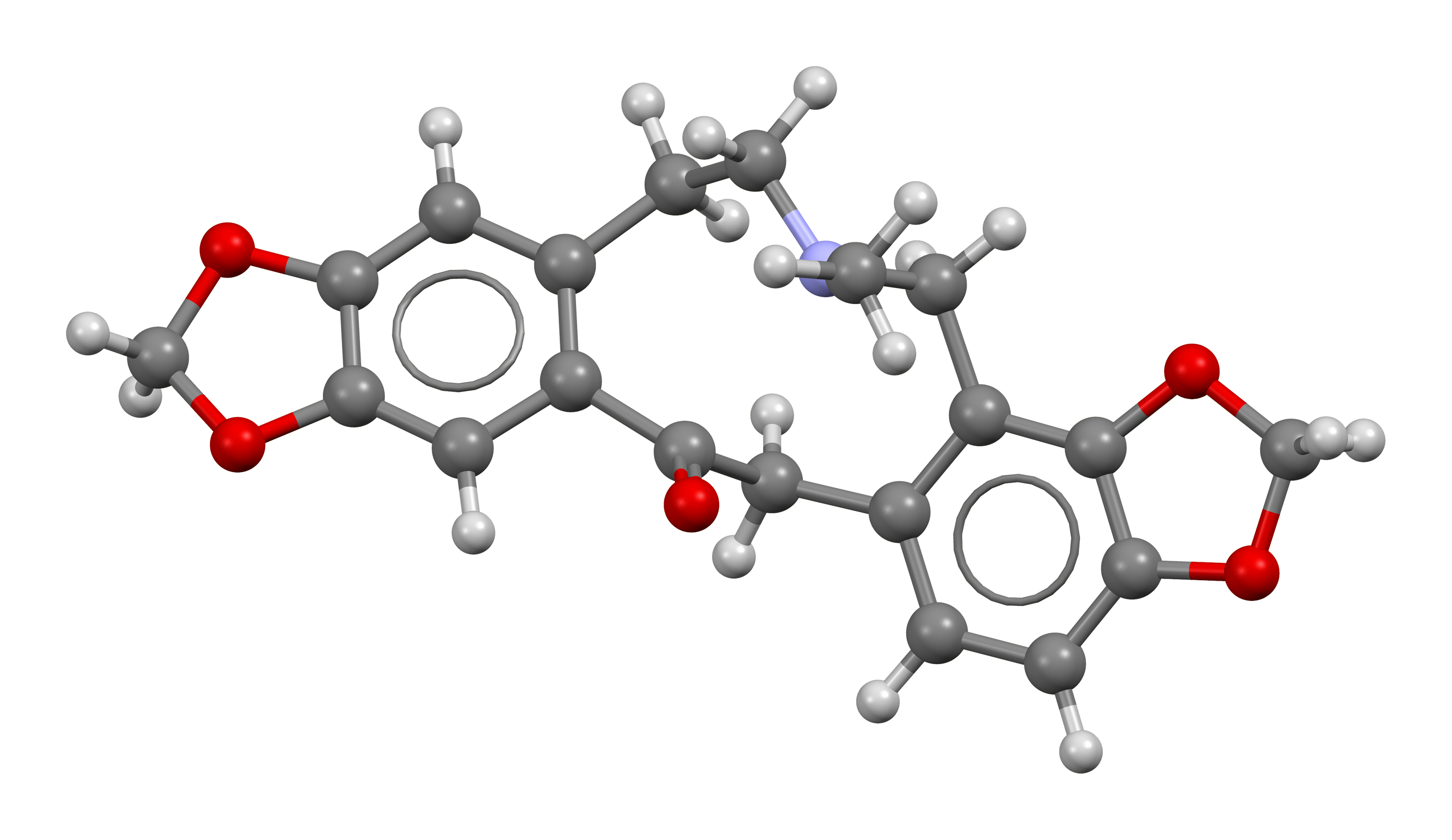

Names
- IUPAC name 7-Methyl-2′H,2′′H-7,13a-secobis([1,3]dioxolo)[4′,5′:2,3;4′′,5′′:9,10]berbin-13a-one
- Systematic IUPAC name 5-Methyl-4,6,7,14-tetrahydro-2H,10H-bis([1,3]benzodioxolo)[4,5-c:5′,6′-g]azecin-13(5H)-one

Identifiers
CAS Number	130-86-9
3D model (JSmol)	Interactive image
ChEBI	CHEBI:16415
ChEMBL	ChEMBL453019
ChemSpider	4799
ECHA InfoCard	100.004.546
EC Number	204-999-6
KEGG	C05189
PubChem CID	4970
UNII	UIW569HT35
CompTox Dashboard (EPA)	DTXSID90156282
- InChI: InChI=1S/C20H19NO5/c1-21-5-4-13-7-18-19(25-10-24-18)8-14(13)16(22)6-12-2-3-17-20(15(12)9-21)26-11-23-17/h2-3,7-8H,4-6,9-11H2,1H3 Key: GPTFURBXHJWNHR-UHFFFAOYSA-N
- SMILES: c15cc3OCOc3cc5CCN(C)Cc2c(CC1=O)ccc4c2OCO4

Properties
Chemical formula	C_{20}H_{19}NO_{5}
Molar mass	353.369 g/mol
Appearance	white crystals
Density	1.399 g/cm^{3}
Melting point	208 °C (406 °F; 481 K)
Solubility in water	practically insoluble
Solubility in chloroform	1:15
- Except where otherwise noted, data are given for materials in their standard state (at 25 °C [77 °F], 100 kPa). Infobox references

Protopine is an alkaloid occurring in opium poppy, Corydalis tubers and other plants of the family papaveraceae, like Fumaria officinalis.

It has been found to inhibit histamine H1 receptors and platelet aggregation, and acts as an analgesic.

== Biosynthesis ==
Protopine is derived in the plants such as the opium poppy, Papaver somniferum, from the benzylisoquinoline alkaloid (S)-reticuline through a progressive series of five enzymatic transformations: 1) berberine bridge enzyme to (S)-scoulerine; 2) (S)-cheilanthifoline synthase/CYP719A25 to (S)-cheilanthifoline; 3) (S)-stylopine synthase/CYP719A20 to (S)-stylopine; 4) (S)-tetrahydroprotoberberine N-methyltransferase to (S)-cis-N-methylstylopine.

The final step is oxidation by the enzyme methyltetrahydroprotoberberine 14-monooxygenase:

(S)-cis-N-methylstylopine

+ NADPH
O_{2}
H_{2}O

Protopine

+ NADP+

== Metabolism ==
The enzyme protopine 6-monooxygenase converts protopine into dihydrosanguinarine. NADP^{+} and water are the by-products.

The enzyme uses reduced nicotinamide adenine dinucleotide phosphate (NADPH), and oxygen, with the initial product being 6-hydroxyprotopine.

Protopine

+ NADPH
O_{2}
H_{2}O

6-hydroxyprotopine

+ NADP^{+}

6-hydroxyprotopine in turn spontaneously rearranges to dihydrosanguinarine:

Spontaneous conversion of 6-hydroxyprotopine to dihydrosanguinarine

== See also ==
- Cryptopine
- Bürgi-Dunitz angle
