= (S)-tetrahydroprotoberberine N-methyltransferase =

Class of enzymes

Identifiers
- EC no.: 2.1.1.122
- CAS no.: 106878-42-6

Databases
- IntEnz: IntEnz view
- BRENDA: BRENDA entry
- ExPASy: NiceZyme view
- KEGG: KEGG entry
- MetaCyc: metabolic pathway
- PRIAM: profile
- PDB structures: RCSB PDB PDBe PDBsum
- Gene Ontology: AmiGO / QuickGO
Search
- PMC: articles
- PubMed: articles
- NCBI: proteins

(S)-tetrahydroprotoberberine N-methyltransferase (EC 2.1.1.122) is an enzyme that catalyzes related methylation reactions in the biosynthesis of benzylisoquinoline alkaloids.

(S)-stylopine
+ SAM
(S)-cis-N-methylstylopine
+ SAH

For example, (S)-stylopine is converted to (S)-cis-N-methylstylopine. The methyl group comes from the cofactor, S-adenosyl methionine (SAM), which becomes S-adenosyl-L-homocysteine (SAH). The enzyme was characterised from Eschscholtzia californica. It methylates (S)-canadine and (S)-tetrahydropalmatine in a similar way.

This enzyme belongs to the family of transferases, specifically those transferring one-carbon group methyltransferases. The systematic name of this enzyme class is S-adenosyl-L-methionine:(S)-7,8,13,14-tetrahydroprotoberberine cis-N-methyltransferase. This enzyme is also called tetrahydroprotoberberine cis-N-methyltransferase. It participates in alkaloid biosynthesis.
