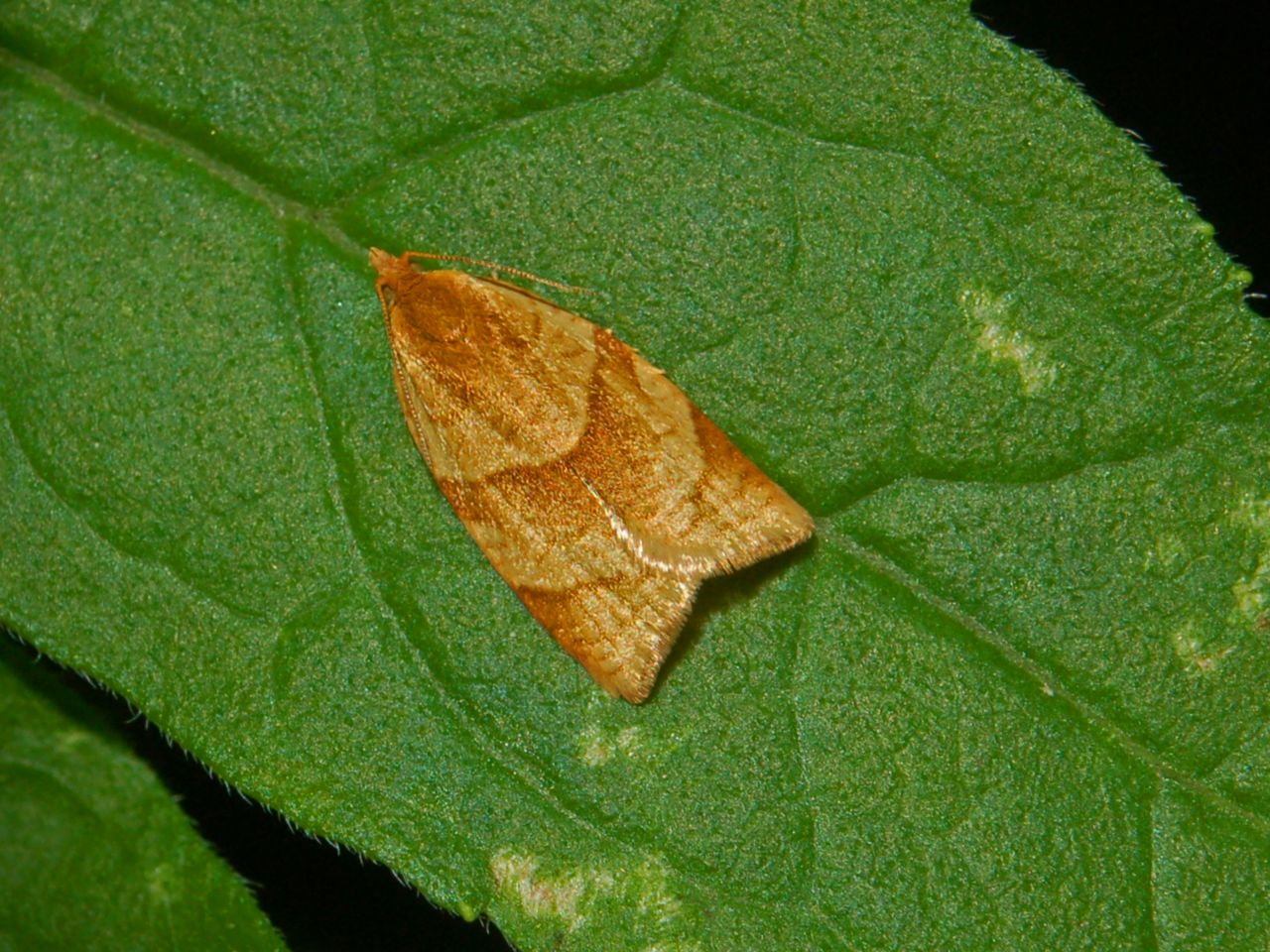
- Clepsis cf. rurinana

Scientific classification
- Kingdom: Animalia
- Phylum: Arthropoda
- Clade: Pancrustacea
- Class: Insecta
- Order: Lepidoptera
- Family: Tortricidae
- Genus: Clepsis
- Species: C. rurinana

Binomial name
- Clepsis rurinana (Linnaeus, 1758)

Synonyms
- Phalaena (Tortrix) rurinana Linnaeus, 1758; Phalaena (Tortrix) angulana Villers, 1789; Phalaena angulosa Fourcroy, 1785; Pyralis avellana Panzer, 1804; Cacoecia idana Kennel, 1919; Tortrix liotoma Meyrick, 1936; Phalaena (Tortrix) modeeriana Linnaeus, 1761; Phalaena (Tortrix) moderiana Linnaeus, 1767; Tortrix obscura Dufrane, 1957; Tortrix semialbana Guenee, 1845

= Clepsis rurinana =

Species of moth

Clepsis rurinana is a moth of the family Tortricidae. It is found in most of Europe, with the exception of Ukraine and part of the Balkan Peninsula, east to the Near East and the eastern part of the Palearctic realm. It is also present in the Indomalayan realm.

The wingspan is 17–20 mm. The forewings with a hardly sinuate, nearly vertical termen. The costal fold extends from the base to before middle. The ground colour is pale ochreous, somewhat brownish-strigulated. The basal patch is brownish dorsally and the central fascia ochreous-brown, its anterior edge nearly straight. The costal patch is ochreous-brown, emitting a straight stria. The hindwings are whitish, apex ochreous-tinged, dorsal half light grey. The larva is grey-green; head and plate of 2 brown.

Adults are on wing from early June to late August in one generation in western Europe. The moths are active in afternoon and evening.

The larvae feed on a wide range of plants, including of Urtica, Chelidonium, Convolvulus, Euphorbia, Rumex, Aconitum, Lilium, Anthriscus, Aster, Rosa, Lonicera xylosteum, Acer and Quercus. They live in spun leaves.

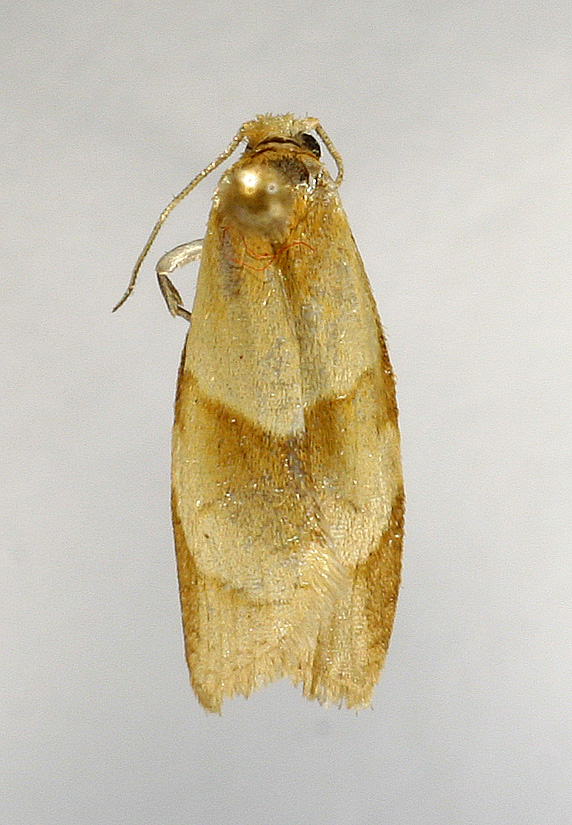
Mounted specimen

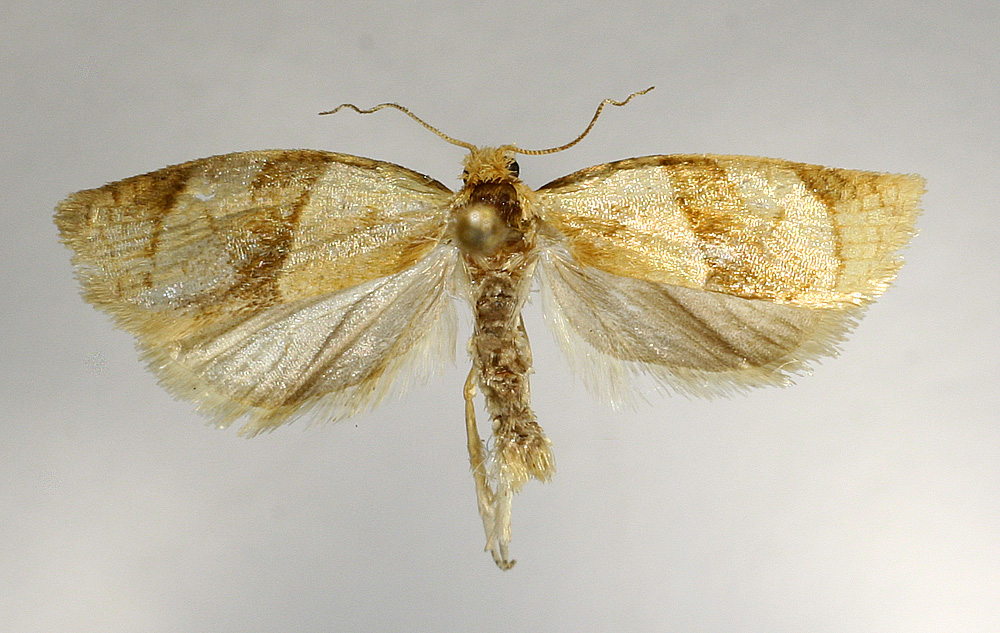
Mounted specimen
