= Massagué =

Massagué is a Catalan-language surname. Notable people with the surname include:

- Domingo Massagué (1900–1979), Spanish footballer
- Iván Massagué (born 1976), Spanish actor
- Joan Massagué (born 1953), Spanish biologist

== See also ==
- Benito Messeguer (1930–1982), Mexican mural artist
- Conrado Walter Massaguer (1889–1965), Cuban artist, satirist and magazine publisher
- Maurice Mességué (1921–2017), French herbalist
- Soufiane Messeguem (born 2001), German footballer
- Yudelmis Domínguez Masague (born 1985), Cuban racing cyclist
- Massaguel, a French commune in Tarn
- Massaguet, a Chadian city in Hadjer-Lamis
- Merseguera, a Spanish grape variety
