= Reticuline oxidase =

Class of enzymes

reticuline oxidase

Identifiers
- EC no.: 1.21.3.3
- CAS no.: 152232-28-5

Databases
- BRENDA: enzyme data
- ExPASy: NiceZyme view
- KEGG: enzyme entry
- MetaCyc: metabolic pathway
- Rhea: reactions
- PDB structures: RCSB PDB PDBe PDBsum
- Gene Ontology: AmiGO / QuickGO
Search
- PMC: articles
- PubMed: articles
- NCBI: proteins

In enzymology, reticuline oxidase (EC 1.21.3.3) is an enzyme that catalyzes the chemical reaction

(S)-reticuline
O_{2}
H_{2}O_{2}
scoulerine

The two substrates of this enzyme are (S)-reticuline and oxygen. Its products are scoulerine and hydrogen peroxide.

This enzyme belongs to the family of oxidoreductases, specifically those acting on X-H and Y-H to form an X-Y bond with oxygen as acceptor. The systematic name of this enzyme class is (S)-reticuline:oxygen oxidoreductase (methylene-bridge-forming). Other names in common use include BBE, berberine bridge enzyme, berberine-bridge-forming enzyme, and tetrahydroprotoberberine synthase. This enzyme participates in alkaloid biosynthesis.
