= Acetylcorynoline =

Names
- Systematic IUPAC name (5bR,6S,12bR)-5b,13-Dimethyl-5b,6,7,12b,13,14-hexahydro-2H,10H-[1,3]benzodioxolo[5,6-c][1,3]dioxolo[4,5-i]phenanthridin-6-yl acetate

Identifiers
CAS Number	18797-80-3
3D model (JSmol)	Interactive image
ChEBI	CHEBI:188060
ChEMBL	ChEMBL4129674
ChemSpider	154160
ECHA InfoCard	100.208.690
EC Number	683-178-8
PubChem CID	177015
UNII	6ZFQ6Y9RZD
CompTox Dashboard (EPA)	DTXSID70172127
- InChI: InChI=1S/C23H23NO6/c1-12(25)30-20-7-13-6-18-19(28-10-27-18)8-14(13)22-23(20,2)16-4-5-17-21(29-11-26-17)15(16)9-24(22)3/h4-6,8,20,22H,7,9-11H2,1-3H3/t20-,22+,23-/m0/s1 Key: PUHCFWFODBLSAP-WWNPGLIZSA-N; InChI=1/C23H23NO6/c1-12(25)30-20-7-13-6-18-19(28-10-27-18)8-14(13)22-23(20,2)16-4-5-17-21(29-11-26-17)15(16)9-24(22)3/h4-6,8,20,22H,7,9-11H2,1-3H3/t20-,22+,23-/m0/s1 Key: PUHCFWFODBLSAP-WWNPGLIZBS
- SMILES: CC(=O)O[C@H]1CC2=CC3=C(C=C2[C@@H]4[C@]1(C5=C(CN4C)C6=C(C=C5)OCO6)C)OCO3

Properties
Chemical formula	C_{23}H_{23}NO_{6}
Molar mass	409.438 g·mol^{−1}

Hazards
- GHS labelling
Pictograms	(GHS06: Toxic)
Signal word	Danger
Hazard statements	H300, H330
Precautionary statements	P260, P264, P270, P271, P284, P301+P316, P304+P340, P316, P320, P321, P330, P403+P233, P405, P501
- Except where otherwise noted, data are given for materials in their standard state (at 25 °C [77 °F], 100 kPa). Infobox references

Acetylcorynoline is a bio-active isolate of Corydalis ambigua. It inhibits the maturing of bone marrow-derived dendritic cells in mice. However, it is only cytotoxic in amounts of greater than 20 μM.
