= 1,2-dehydroreticuline synthase =

Class of enzymes

Identifiers
- EC no.: 1.14.19.54

Databases
- BRENDA: enzyme data
- ExPASy: NiceZyme view
- KEGG: enzyme entry
- MetaCyc: metabolic pathway
- Rhea: reactions
- PDB structures: RCSB PDB PDBe PDBsum
Search
- PMC: articles
- PubMed: articles
- NCBI: proteins

1,2-dehydroreticuline synthase (EC 1.14.19.54) and CYP Symbol CYP82Y2 (cytochrome P450, family 82, member Y2), is an enzyme isolated from the opium poppy Papaver somniferum and the field poppy Papaver rhoeas that catalyzes the chemical reaction:

(S)-reticuline
+ NADPH
O_{2}
2 H_{2}O
reticulinylium cation
+ NADP^{+}

The three substrates of this enzyme are (S)-reticuline, reduced nicotinamide adenine dinucleotide phosphate (NADPH) and oxygen. Its products are 1,2-dehydroreticulinium cation, oxidised NADP^{+}, and water. The enzyme from field poppy is specific for the (S) enantiomer of reticuline. In the opium poppy, this enzyme forms a fusion protein with 1,2-dehydroreticulinium reductase (NADPH), which immediately converts the reticulinylium cation into {R)-reticuline. The overall result is that (S)-reticuline is converted to {R)-reticuline, which is the precursor of salutaridine, on the pathway to morphine. This gene fusion event has been suggested to evolve only once, about 20 million years ago.

(S)-reticuline
(R)-reticuline
salutaridine

The enzyme is a hemoprotein of cytochrome P450 type.
