= (S)-canadine synthase =

Class of enzymes

Identifiers
- EC no.: 1.14.19.68
- CAS no.: 114308-22-4

Databases
- IntEnz: IntEnz view
- BRENDA: BRENDA entry
- ExPASy: NiceZyme view
- KEGG: KEGG entry
- MetaCyc: metabolic pathway
- PRIAM: profile
- PDB structures: RCSB PDB PDBe PDBsum
- Gene Ontology: AmiGO / QuickGO
Search
- PMC: articles
- PubMed: articles
- NCBI: proteins

In enzymology, a (S)-canadine synthase (EC 1.14.19.68) is an enzyme that catalyzes the chemical reaction

(S)-tetrahydrocolumbamine + NADPH + H^{+} + O_{2} $\rightleftharpoons$ (S)-canadine + NADP^{+} + 2 H_{2}O

The 4 substrates of this enzyme are (S)-tetrahydrocolumbamine, NADPH, H^{+}, and O_{2}, whereas its 3 products are Canadine, NADP^{+}, and H_{2}O.

This enzyme belongs to the family of oxidoreductases, specifically those acting on paired donors, with O_{2} as oxidant and incorporation or reduction of oxygen. The oxygen incorporated need not be derived from O_{2} with NADH or NADPH as one donor, and the other dehydrogenated. The systematic name of this enzyme class is (S)-tetrahydrocolumbamine,NADPH:oxygen oxidoreductase (methylenedioxy-bridge-forming). Other names in common use include (S)-tetrahydroberberine synthase, and (S)-tetrahydrocolumbamine oxidase (methylenedioxy-bridge-forming). This enzyme participates in alkaloid biosynthesis i. It employs one cofactor, heme-thiolate(P-450).
