= 3'-hydroxy-N-methyl-(S)-coclaurine 4'-O-methyltransferase =

Class of enzymes

Identifiers
- EC no.: 2.1.1.116
- CAS no.: 132084-81-2

Databases
- IntEnz: IntEnz view
- BRENDA: BRENDA entry
- ExPASy: NiceZyme view
- KEGG: KEGG entry
- MetaCyc: metabolic pathway
- PRIAM: profile
- PDB structures: RCSB PDB PDBe PDBsum
- Gene Ontology: AmiGO / QuickGO
Search
- PMC: articles
- PubMed: articles
- NCBI: proteins

In enzymology, 3'-hydroxy-N-methyl-(S)-coclaurine 4'-O-methyltransferase (EC 2.1.1.116) is an enzyme that catalyzes the chemical reaction

(S)-3'-hydroxy-N-methylcoclaurine
+ SAM
(S)-reticuline
+ SAH

The two substrates of this enzyme are (S)-3'-hydroxy-N-methylcoclaurine and S-adenosyl methionine (SAM). Its products are (S)-reticuline and S-adenosylhomocysteine (SAH).

This enzyme belongs to the family of transferases, specifically those transferring one-carbon group methyltransferases. The systematic name of this enzyme class is S-adenosyl-L-methionine:3'-hydroxy-N-methyl-(S)-coclaurine 4'-O-methyltransferase. This enzyme participates in alkaloid biosynthesis.
