= Chelidonine =

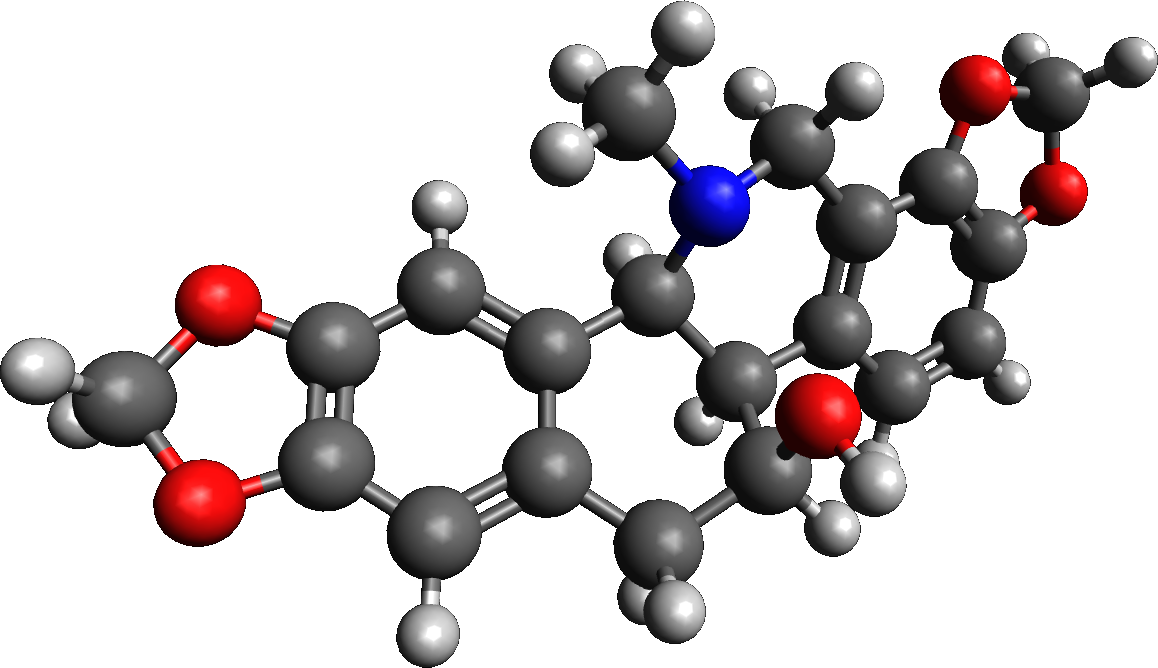

Names
- IUPAC name Chelidonine
- Systematic IUPAC name (5bR,6S,12bS)-13-Methyl-5b,6,7,12b,13,14-hexahydro-2H,10H-[1,3]benzodioxolo[5,6-c][1,3]dioxolo[4,5-i]phenanthridin-6-ol

Identifiers
CAS Number	476-32-4
3D model (JSmol)	Interactive image
ChEBI	CHEBI:31389
ChEMBL	ChEMBL436279
ChemSpider	171216
ECHA InfoCard	100.006.823
KEGG	C12242
PubChem CID	197810
UNII	8K7EK8446J
CompTox Dashboard (EPA)	DTXSID10878474
- InChI: InChI=1S/C20H19NO5/c1-21-7-13-11(2-3-15-20(13)26-9-23-15)18-14(22)4-10-5-16-17(25-8-24-16)6-12(10)19(18)21/h2-3,5-6,14,18-19,22H,4,7-9H2,1H3/t14-,18-,19+/m0/s1 Key: GHKISGDRQRSCII-ZOCIIQOWSA-N; InChI=1/C20H19NO5/c1-21-7-13-11(2-3-15-20(13)26-9-23-15)18-14(22)4-10-5-16-17(25-8-24-16)6-12(10)19(18)21/h2-3,5-6,14,18-19,22H,4,7-9H2,1H3/t14-,18-,19+/m0/s1 Key: GHKISGDRQRSCII-ZOCIIQOWBJ
- SMILES: CN1CC2=C(C=CC3=C2OCO3)[C@@H]4[C@H]1C5=CC6=C(C=C5C[C@@H]4O)OCO6

Properties
Chemical formula	C_{20}H_{19}NO_{5}
Molar mass	353.374 g·mol^{−1}
- Except where otherwise noted, data are given for materials in their standard state (at 25 °C [77 °F], 100 kPa). Infobox references

Chelidonine is an isolate of Papaveraceae with acetylcholinesterase and butyrylcholinesterase inhibitory activity.

== Introduction ==
Chelidonine is the major alkaloid component of Chelidonium majus. Chelidonium majus L. is the only species of the tribe Chelidonieae of the family Papaveraceae. Papaveraceae is rich in specific alkaloids. C. majus contains various isoquinoline alkaloids with protopine, protoberberine and benzophenanthridine structures. This benzophenanthridine alkaloid can induce apoptosis in some transformed or malignant cell lines.

D-Chelidonine, the main alkaloid of Chelidonium majus, was first isolated in 1839. The supposed healing properties of greater celandine (Chelidonium majus) were believed in throughout Europe and Asia during the Imperial Roman period (Pliny 1966), and New World aboriginal cultures used BIA-containing plants by using sap or root extracts to treat minor cuts and infections.

== Synthesis ==
The amide (N-(bicyclo[4.2.0]octa-1,3,5-trien-7-yl)-2-ethenylbenzamide) was heated in boiling bromobenzene to form the transfused compound. By contrast, thermolysis of the more flexible urethane (methyl bicyclo[4.2.0]octa-1,3,5-trien-7-yl[(2-ethenylphenyl)methyl]carbamate) afforded the desired cis fused product. The building blocks required for the synthesis of chelidonine are urethane and benzyl bromide. The urethane was obtained by first using the nitrile (5,6-dihydro-2H-cyclobuta[f][1,3]benzodioxole-5-carbonitrile), duo to hydrolysis carboxylic acid was generated. The carboxylic acid which on Curtius degradation yielded crude isocyanate (N=C=O). The reaction of crude isocyanate with benzyl alcohol made the urethane, with the NHCOOC7H7 side group. The benzyl bromide was obtained by the conversion of 2,3-methylenedioxybenzaldehyde to 1,2,3,4 - tetrahydro-7,8-methylenedioxyisoquinol by the successive Hofmann and von Braun degradations.

Condensation of urethane and benzyl bromide led to the formation of the oily styrene. From this structure the liquid acetylene was formed. Next, the crystalline tetrahydrobenz[c]phenanthridine was formed. hydroboration and oxidation produced an alcohol. Jones oxidation gave rise to the ketone. And by processing the ketone the desired cis,cis-alcohol was formed. After hydrogenolysis of the benzyloxycarbonyl group, dl-norchelidonine was synthesized.

== Available forms ==
Chelidonine has a few forms which are synthesized in a similar way and which are structurally alike, including: (+)-homochelidonine, (+)-chelamine and (−)-norchelidonine are tertiary benzo[c]phenanthridine alkaloids with partially hydrogenated B and C rings. They occur in a number of plant species of the family Papaveraceae. The first two have been isolated from the roots of Chelidonium majus L. as minor alkaloids. Enantiomeric (+)-norchelidonine has been recently found in C. majus.

== Metabolism ==
Chelidonine is a major bioactive, isoquinoline alkaloid ingredient in Chelidonium majus. Benzylisoquinoline alkaloids (BIAs) are a structurally diverse group of plant specialized metabolites with a long history of investigation. A restricted number of enzyme families have been implicated in BIA metabolism. Whereas some enzymes exhibit a relatively broad substrate range, others are highly substrate specific.

A small number of plant species, including opium poppy (Papaver somniferum) and other members of the Ranunculales, have emerged as model systems to study BIA metabolism. Recently, the emergence of transcriptomics, proteomics and metabolomics has expedited the discovery of new BIA biosynthetic genes.

In general, methyltransferases of BIA metabolism accept a wide variety of alkaloid substrates with diverse backbone structures, with some showing more flexibility than others with respect to substrate range.

== Indications ==
Chelidonine is an isolate of Papaveraceae with acetylcholinesterase and butyrylcholinesterase (a nonspecific cholinesterase) inhibitory activity. AChE (acetylcholinesterase) inhibitors or anti-cholinesterases inhibit the enzyme cholinesterase from breaking down ACh, increasing both the level and duration of the neurotransmitter action. According to the mode of action, AChE inhibitors can be divided into two groups: irreversible and reversible.

Reversible inhibitors, competitive or noncompetitive, mostly have therapeutic applications, while toxic effects are associated with irreversible AChE activity modulators. Reversible AChE inhibitors play an important role in pharmacological manipulation of the enzyme activity. These inhibitors include compounds with different functional groups (carbamate, quaternary or tertiary ammonium group), and have been applied in the diagnostic and/or treatment of various diseases such as: myasthenia gravis, AD, post-operative ileus, bladder distention, glaucoma, as well as antidote to anticholinergic overdose.

== Toxicity ==
Chelidonine has been studied in multiple organisms, but mainly in rats and mice. In these organisms, sublethal doses of chelidonine caused ptosis tremor, sedation, and a decrease in body temperature. The LD50 of chelidonine, intraperitoneally administered, is in mice 1.3 g/kg and in rats 2 g/kg. There are not many studies of toxicity of chelidonine in humans.
