= 1,2-dehydroreticulinium reductase (NADPH) =

Class of enzymes

Identifiers
- EC no.: 1.5.1.27
- CAS no.: 130590-58-8

Databases
- IntEnz: IntEnz view
- BRENDA: BRENDA entry
- ExPASy: NiceZyme view
- KEGG: KEGG entry
- MetaCyc: metabolic pathway
- PRIAM: profile
- PDB structures: RCSB PDB PDBe PDBsum
- Gene Ontology: AmiGO / QuickGO
Search
- PMC: articles
- PubMed: articles
- NCBI: proteins

1,2-dehydroreticulinium reductase (NADPH) (EC 1.5.1.27) is an enzyme that catalyzes the chemical reaction

reticulinylium cation
+ NADPH
H^{+}
(R)-reticuline
+ NADP^{+}

The three substrates of this enzyme are 1,2-dehydroreticulinium cation, reduced nicotinamide adenine dinucleotide phosphate (NADPH) and a proton. Its products are (R)-reticuline and oxidised NADP^{+}. The enzyme does not catalyse the reverse (oxidation) reaction.

This enzyme belongs to the family of oxidoreductases, specifically those acting on the CH-NH group of donors with NAD+ or NADP+ as acceptor. The systematic name of this enzyme class is (R)-reticuline:NADP+ oxidoreductase. This enzyme is also called 1,2-dehydroreticulinium ion reductase. It participates in morphinan alkaloid biosynthesis.

In the opium poppy, Papaver somniferum, this enzyme forms a fusion protein with 1,2-dehydroreticuline synthase, which converts (S)-reticuline to reticulinylium cation. The overall result is that the (S) enantiomer of reticuline is converted to {R)-reticuline, which is the precursor of salutaridine, on the pathway to morphine. This gene fusion event has been suggested to evolve only once, about 20 million years ago.

(S)-reticuline
(R)-reticuline
salutaridine
