= (S)-stylopine synthase =

Class of enzymes

Identifiers
- EC no.: 1.14.19.64
- CAS no.: 138791-29-4

Databases
- BRENDA: enzyme data
- ExPASy: NiceZyme view
- KEGG: enzyme entry
- MetaCyc: metabolic pathway
- Rhea: reactions
- PDB structures: RCSB PDB PDBe PDBsum
- Gene Ontology: AmiGO / QuickGO
Search
- PMC: articles
- PubMed: articles
- NCBI: proteins

In enzymology, (S)-stylopine synthase (EC 1.14.19.64) is an enzyme that catalyzes the chemical reaction

cheilanthifoline
+ NADPH
O_{2}
2 H_{2}O
(S)-stylopine
+ NADP^{+}

It is the final step in synthesizing S-stylopine, a central intermediate in the synthesis of diverse benzylisoquinoline alkaloids.

The three substrates of this enzyme are (S)-cheilanthifoline, reduced nicotinamide adenine dinucleotide phosphate (NADPH), and oxygen. Its products are (S)-stylopine, oxidised NADP^{+}, and water.

This enzyme belongs to the family of oxidoreductases, specifically those acting on paired donors, with O2 as oxidant and incorporation or reduction of oxygen. The oxygen incorporated need not be derived from O2 with NADH or NADPH as one donor, and the other dehydrogenated.

This enzyme participates in alkaloid biosynthesis.

== Nomenclature ==
The systematic name of this enzyme class is (S)-cheilanthifoline,NADPH:oxygen oxidoreductase (methylenedioxy-bridge-forming). This enzyme is also called

- (S)-cheilanthifoline oxidase (methylenedioxy-bridge-forming)
