= Berberine reductase =

Enzyme

berberine reductase

Identifiers
- EC no.: 1.5.1.31

Databases
- BRENDA: enzyme data
- ExPASy: NiceZyme view
- KEGG: enzyme entry
- MetaCyc: metabolic pathway
- Rhea: reactions
- PDB structures: RCSB PDB PDBe PDBsum
- Gene Ontology: AmiGO / QuickGO
Search
- PMC: articles
- PubMed: articles
- NCBI: proteins

Berberine reductase (EC 1.5.1.31) is an enzyme that catalyzes the chemical reaction

(R)-canadine
+ 2 NADP^{+}
2 H^{+}
2 H^{+}
berberine
+ 2 NADPH

The two substrates of this enzyme are (R)-canadine and oxidised nicotinamide adenine dinucleotide phosphate (NADP^{+}). Its products are berberine, reduced NADPH, and two protons.

This enzyme belongs to the family of oxidoreductases, specifically those acting on the CH-NH group of donors with NAD+ or NADP+ as acceptor. The systematic name of this enzyme class is (R)-tetrahydroberberine:NADP+ oxidoreductase. This enzyme is also called (R)-canadine synthase.
