= (S)-cheilanthifoline synthase =

Class of enzymes

Identifiers
- EC no.: 1.14.21.2
- CAS no.: 138791-27-2

Databases
- BRENDA: enzyme data
- ExPASy: NiceZyme view
- KEGG: enzyme entry
- MetaCyc: metabolic pathway
- Rhea: reactions
- PDB structures: RCSB PDB PDBe PDBsum
- Gene Ontology: AmiGO / QuickGO
Search
- PMC: articles
- PubMed: articles
- NCBI: proteins

In enzymology, (S)-cheilanthifoline synthase (EC 1.14.21.2) is an enzyme that catalyzes the chemical reaction

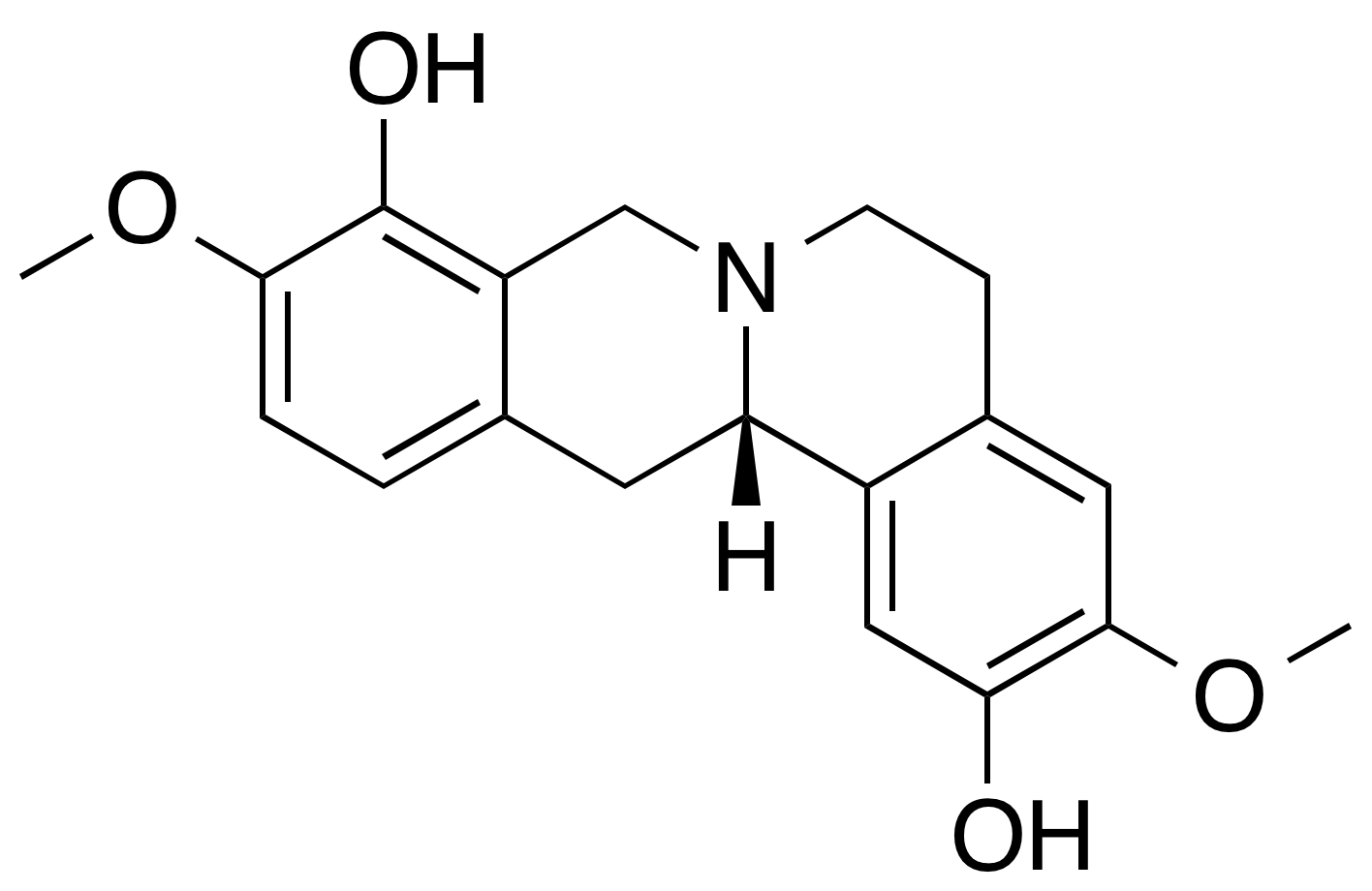
scoulerine
+ NADPH
O_{2}
2 H_{2}O
cheilanthifoline
+ NADP^{+}

The three substrates of this enzyme are (S)-scoulerine, reduced nicotinamide adenine dinucleotide phosphate (NADPH), and oxygen. Its products are cheilanthifoline, oxidised NADP^{+}, and water.

This enzyme belongs to the family of oxidoreductases, specifically those acting on paired donors, with O2 as oxidant and incorporation or reduction of oxygen. The oxygen incorporated need not be derived from O2 with NADH or NADPH as one donor, and the other dehydrogenated. The systematic name of this enzyme class is (S)-scoulerine,NADPH:oxygen oxidoreductase (methylenedioxy-bridge-forming). This enzyme is also called (S)-scoulerine oxidase (methylenedioxy-bridge-forming). The enzyme participates in alkaloid biosynthesis. In recent development, it has been determined that cheilanthifoline synthase can be cloned. Researchers are currently researching how this cloning might be found in yeast.
