= Vanillyl-alcohol oxidase =

Class of enzymes

vanillyl-alcohol oxidase
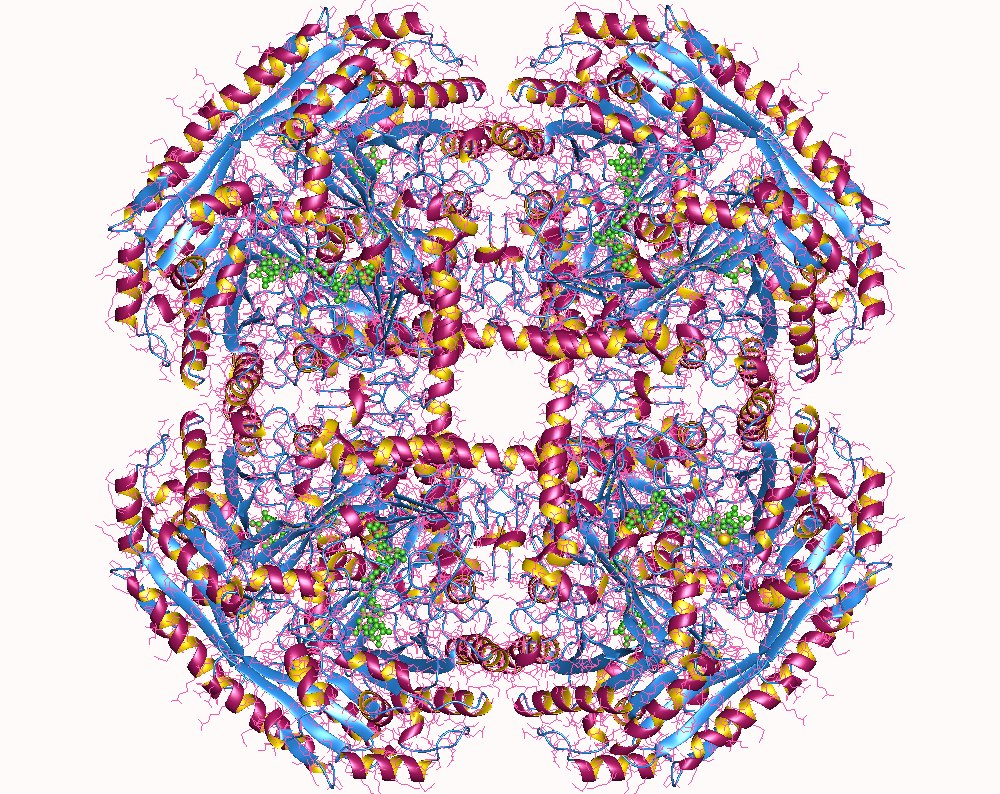
- Vanillyl-alcohol oxidase homooctamer, Penicillium simplicissimum

Identifiers
- EC no.: 1.1.3.38
- CAS no.: 143929-24-2

Databases
- BRENDA: enzyme data
- ExPASy: NiceZyme view
- KEGG: enzyme entry
- MetaCyc: metabolic pathway
- Rhea: reactions
- PDB structures: RCSB PDB PDBe PDBsum
- Gene Ontology: AmiGO / QuickGO
Search
- PMC: articles
- PubMed: articles
- NCBI: proteins

In enzymology, a vanillyl-alcohol oxidase (EC 1.1.3.38) is an enzyme that catalyzes the chemical reaction

+ O_{2} $\rightleftharpoons$ + H_{2}O_{2}

Thus, the two substrates of this enzyme are vanillyl alcohol and O_{2}, whereas its two products are vanillin and H_{2}O_{2}.

This enzyme belongs to the family of oxidoreductases, specifically those acting on the CH-OH group of donor with oxygen as acceptor. The systematic name of this enzyme class is vanillyl alcohol:oxygen oxidoreductase. This enzyme is also called 4-hydroxy-2-methoxybenzyl alcohol oxidase. This enzyme participates in 2,4-dichlorobenzoate degradation. It employs one cofactor, FAD.

== Structural studies ==
As of late 2007, 3 structures have been solved for this class of enzymes, with PDB accession codes PDB: 1DZN, PDB: 1E0Y, and PDB: 1E8G.
