= Coptisine =

Names
- IUPAC name 7,8,13,13a-Tetradehydro-2′H,2′′H-bis([1,3]dioxolo)[4′,5′:2,3;4′′,5′′:9,10]berbin-7-ium
- Systematic IUPAC name 6,7-Dihydro-2H,10H-5λ^{5}-[1,3]dioxolo[4,5-g][1,3]dioxolo[4′,5′:7,8]isoquinolino[3,2-a]isoquinolin-5-ylium

Identifiers
CAS Number	3486-66-6
3D model (JSmol)	Interactive image
ChEMBL	ChEMBL362071
ChemSpider	65268
PubChem CID	72322
UNII	0GCL71VN14
CompTox Dashboard (EPA)	DTXSID10188404
- InChI: InChI=1S/C19H14NO4/c1-2-16-19(24-10-21-16)14-8-20-4-3-12-6-17-18(23-9-22-17)7-13(12)15(20)5-11(1)14/h1-2,5-8H,3-4,9-10H2/q+1 Key: XYHOBCMEDLZUMP-UHFFFAOYSA-N
- SMILES: O1c3c(OC1)c2c[n+]6c(cc2cc3)c5cc4OCOc4cc5CC6

Properties
Chemical formula	C_{19}H_{14}NO_{4}+
Molar mass	320.319
- Except where otherwise noted, data are given for materials in their standard state (at 25 °C [77 °F], 100 kPa). Infobox references

Coptisine is an alkaloid found in Chinese goldthread (Coptis chinensis), greater celandine, and opium. Famous for the bitter taste that it produces, it is used in Chinese herbal medicine along with the related compound berberine for digestive disorders caused by bacterial infections.

== Biosynthesis ==
Coptisine is produced from tetrahydrocoptisine by an oxidation reaction catalysed by the enzyme tetrahydroberberine oxidase.

tetrahydrocoptisine
+ H^{+}
2 O_{2}
2 H_{2}O_{2}
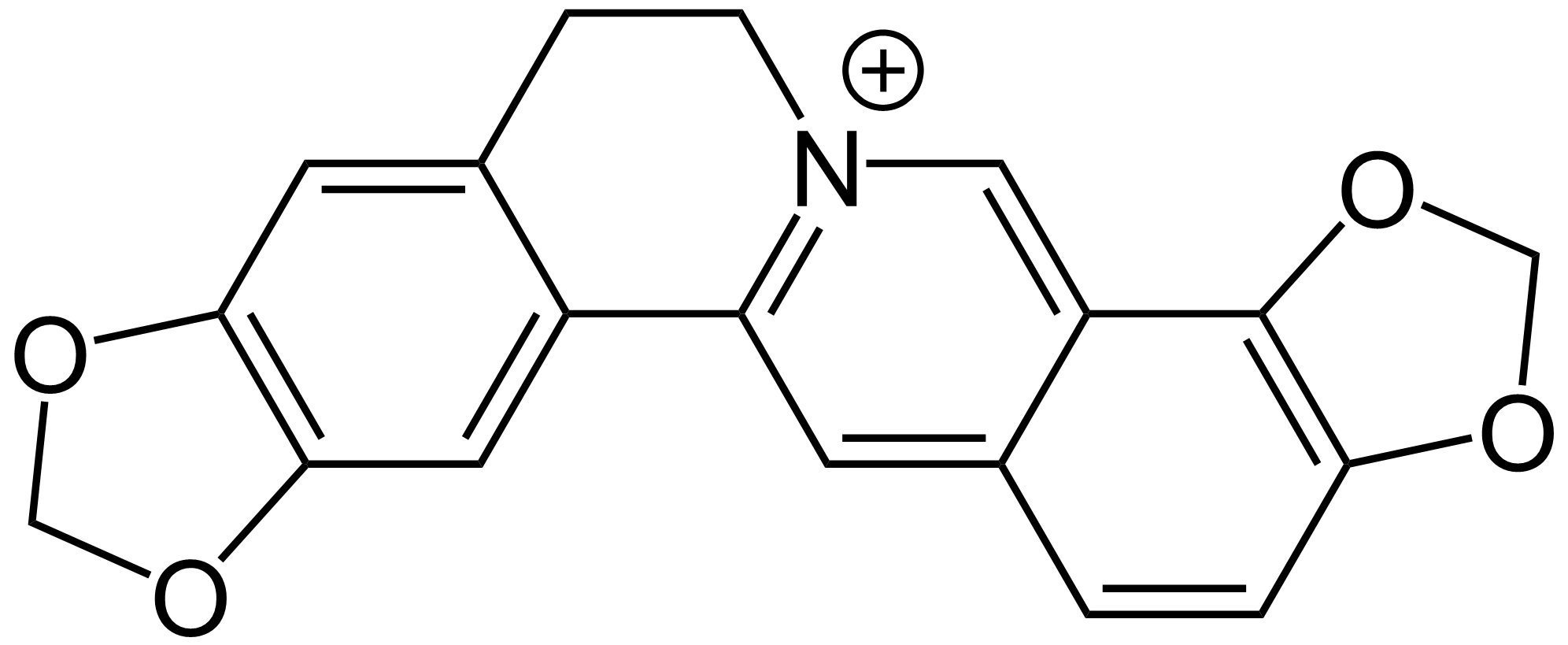
coptisine
