= Corynoline =

Names
- IUPAC name 13-Methylchelidonine
- Systematic IUPAC name (5bR,6S,12bR)-5b,13-Dimethyl-5b,6,7,12b,13,14-hexahydro-2H,10H-[1,3]benzodioxolo[5,6-c][1,3]dioxolo[4,5-h]phenanthridin-6-ol

Identifiers
CAS Number	18797-79-0; 68035-45-0
3D model (JSmol)	Interactive image
ChEBI	CHEBI:65660
ChEMBL	ChEMBL4126384
ChemSpider	154159
ECHA InfoCard	100.208.689
EC Number	683-177-2
PubChem CID	177014
UNII	ZQ9W3JU6N3
CompTox Dashboard (EPA)	DTXSID20940272
- InChI: InChI=1S/C21H21NO5/c1-21-14-3-4-15-19(27-10-24-15)13(14)8-22(2)20(21)12-7-17-16(25-9-26-17)5-11(12)6-18(21)23/h3-5,7,18,20,23H,6,8-10H2,1-2H3/t18-,20+,21-/m0/s1 Key: IQUGPRHKZNCHGC-TYPHKJRUSA-N; InChI=1/C21H21NO5/c1-21-14-3-4-15-19(27-10-24-15)13(14)8-22(2)20(21)12-7-17-16(25-9-26-17)5-11(12)6-18(21)23/h3-5,7,18,20,23H,6,8-10H2,1-2H3/t18-,20+,21-/m0/s1 Key: IQUGPRHKZNCHGC-TYPHKJRUBF
- SMILES: O1c2c(OC1)c3c(cc2)[C@@]5([C@H](N(C3)C)c4cc6OCOc6cc4C[C@@H]5O)C

Properties
Chemical formula	C_{21}H_{21}NO_{5}
Molar mass	367.401 g·mol^{−1}
- Except where otherwise noted, data are given for materials in their standard state (at 25 °C [77 °F], 100 kPa). Infobox references

Corynoline is an acetylcholinesterase inhibitor isolated from Corydalis incisa.
