= Scoulerine =

- Scoulerine

Names
- IUPAC name 3,10-Dimethoxyberbine-2,9-diol
- Systematic IUPAC name (13aS)-3,10-Dimethoxy-5,8,13,13a-tetrahydro-6H-isoquinolino[3,2-a]isoquinoline-2,9-diol
- Other names (S)-Scoulerin; Discretamine; Aequaline

Identifiers
CAS Number	6451-73-6
3D model (JSmol)	Interactive image
ChEBI	CHEBI:17129
ChEMBL	ChEMBL1235966
ChemSpider	388725
KEGG	C02106
PubChem CID	439654
- InChI: InChI=1S/C19H21NO4/c1-23-17-4-3-11-7-15-13-9-16(21)18(24-2)8-12(13)5-6-20(15)10-14(11)19(17)22/h3-4,8-9,15,21-22H,5-7,10H2,1-2H3/t15-/m0/s1 Key: KNWVMRVOBAFFMH-HNNXBMFYSA-N
- SMILES: Oc1c4c(ccc1OC)C[C@H]3c2c(cc(OC)c(O)c2)CCN3C4

Properties
Chemical formula	C_{19}H_{21}NO_{4}
Molar mass	327.380 g·mol^{−1}
- Except where otherwise noted, data are given for materials in their standard state (at 25 °C [77 °F], 100 kPa). Infobox references

Scoulerine, also known as discretamine and aequaline, is a benzylisoquinoline alkaloid (BIA) that is derived directly from (S)-reticuline through the action of berberine bridge enzyme. It is a precursor of other BIAs, notably berberine, noscapine, (S)-tetrahydropalmatine, and (S)-stylopine, as well as the alkaloids protopine, and sanguinarine. It is found in many plants, including opium poppy, Croton flavens, and certain plants in the genus Erythrina.

Studies show that scoulerine is an antagonist in vitro at the α_{2}-adrenoceptor, α_{1D}-adrenoceptor and 5-HT receptor. It has also been found to be a GABA_{A} receptor agonist in vitro.

== Biosynthesis ==
Scoulerine is produced by action of the enzyme reticuline oxidase, which uses oxygen to convert the N-methyl group of (S)-reticuline into a so-called "berberine bridge".

(S)-reticuline
O_{2}
2 H_{2}O
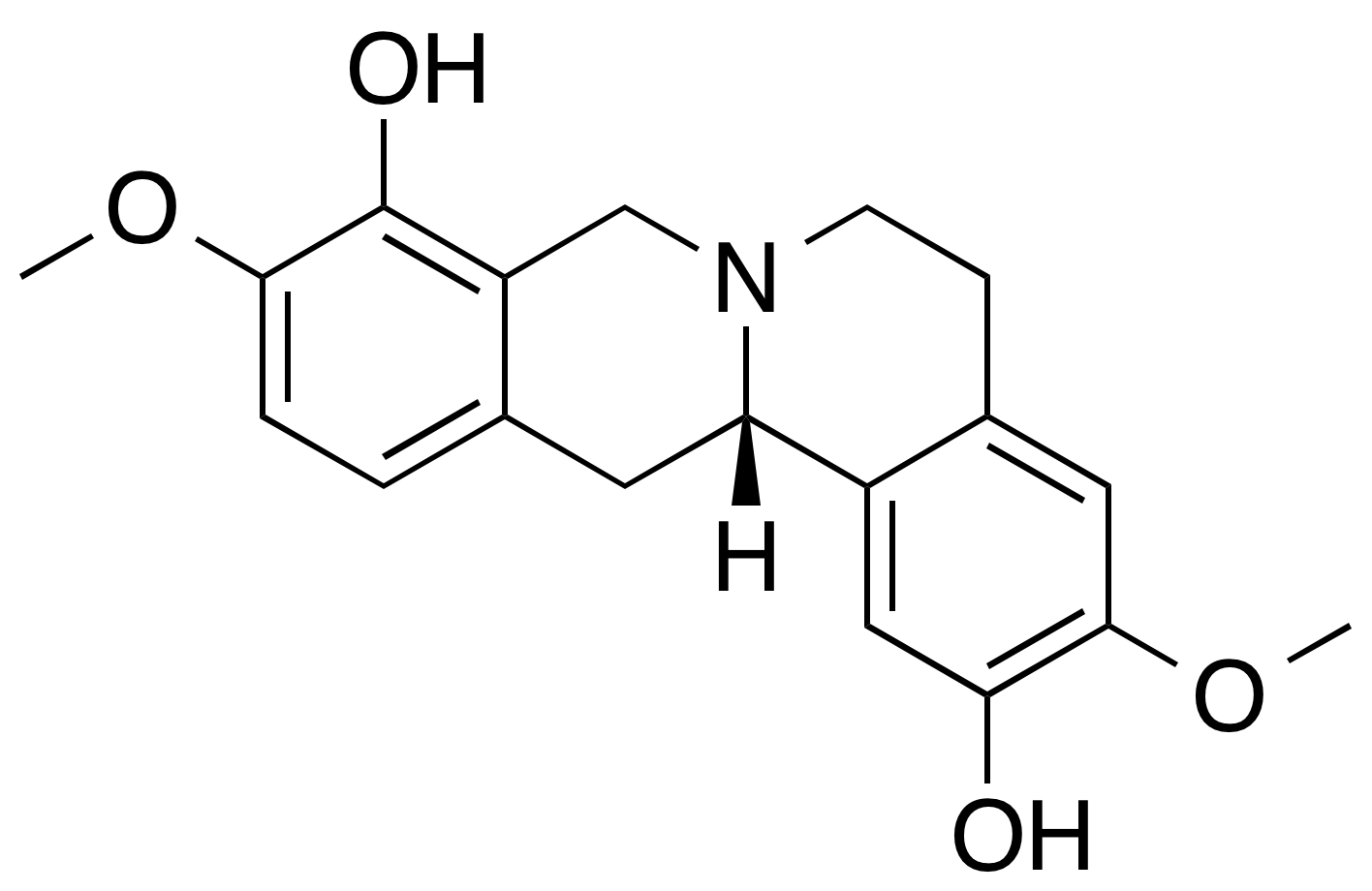
scoulerine
