= FAD-oxidase =

FAD linked oxidases, C-terminal domain
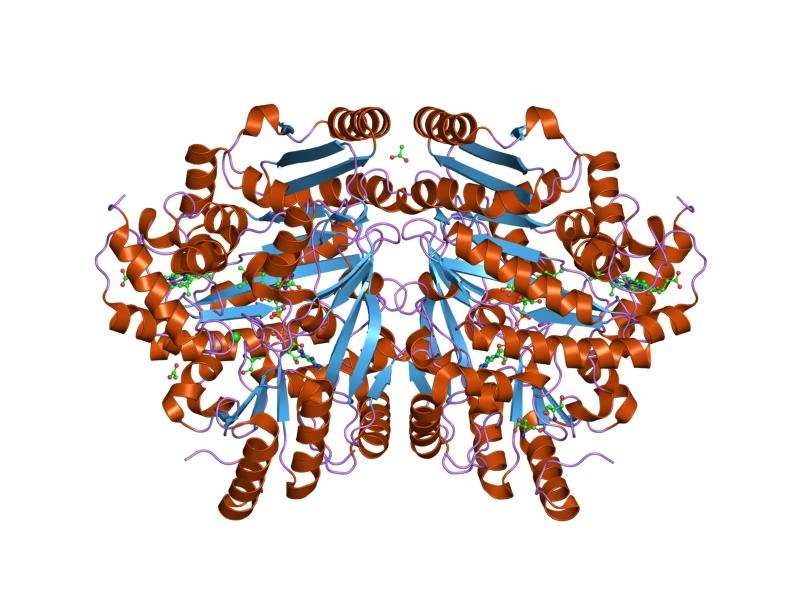
- p-cresol methylhydroxylase: alteration of the structure of the flavoprotein subunit upon its binding to the cytochrome subunit

Identifiers
- Symbol: FAD-oxidase_C
- Pfam: PF02913
- Pfam clan: CL0277
- InterPro: IPR004113
- SCOP2: 1ahu / SCOPe / SUPFAM
Available protein structures:
- PDB: IPR004113 PF02913 (ECOD; PDBsum)
- AlphaFold: IPR004113; PF02913

In molecular biology FAD-oxidases are a family of FAD-dependent oxidoreductases. They are flavoproteins that contain a covalently bound FAD group which is attached to a histidine via an 8-alpha-(N3-histidyl)-riboflavin linkage. The region around the histidine that binds the FAD group is conserved in these enzymes.
