= Hexose oxidase =

Oxidoreductase enzyme

hexose oxidase

Identifiers
- EC no.: 1.1.3.5
- CAS no.: 9028-75-5

Databases
- BRENDA: enzyme data
- ExPASy: NiceZyme view
- KEGG: enzyme entry
- MetaCyc: metabolic pathway
- Rhea: reactions
- PDB structures: RCSB PDB PDBe PDBsum
- Gene Ontology: AmiGO / QuickGO
Search
- PMC: articles
- PubMed: articles
- NCBI: proteins

In enzymology, hexose oxidase (EC 1.1.3.5) is an enzyme that catalyzes the chemical reaction:

β-D-glucopyranose
O_{2}
H_{2}O_{2}
O_{2}
H_{2}O_{2}
glucono-δ-lactone

This enzyme belongs to the family of oxidoreductases (enzymes involved in redox reactions), specifically those acting on the CH−OH group of donors with oxygen as acceptor. The systematic name of this enzyme class is D-hexose:oxygen 1-oxidoreductase. This enzyme participates in pentose phosphate pathway. It employs one cofactor, copper.
