= Maurice Mességué =

French herbalist and author (1921–2017)

Undated portrait of Mességué

Maurice Mességué (14 December 1921 in Colayrac-Saint-Cirq – 16 June 2017 in Auvillar) was a French herbalist and author of several books on herbal medicine and cooking with herbs until his retirement in 1994. He treated several celebrities and personalities of his time, including Mistinguett, Grace Kelly, Jean Cocteau and Max Grundig. In his autobiography, he also claimed to have treated Winston Churchill, German chancellor Konrad Adenauer, and the future Pope John XXIII.

In 1971, he was elected the mayor of the town of Fleurance, a position he held for 18 years. He spent the last twenty-five years of his life in his wife's hometown of Auvillar, where he was also buried.

Mességué practiced a form of herbalism passed down through his family. Some of the practices involve, among other things, soaking the patient's feet and hands in a strong concoction of locally gathered herbs.

== Books ==
- Mességué, Maurice (January 1973). Of People and Plants : The Autobiography of Europe's Most Celebrated Healer. New York: Macmillan. OCLC 621984.
