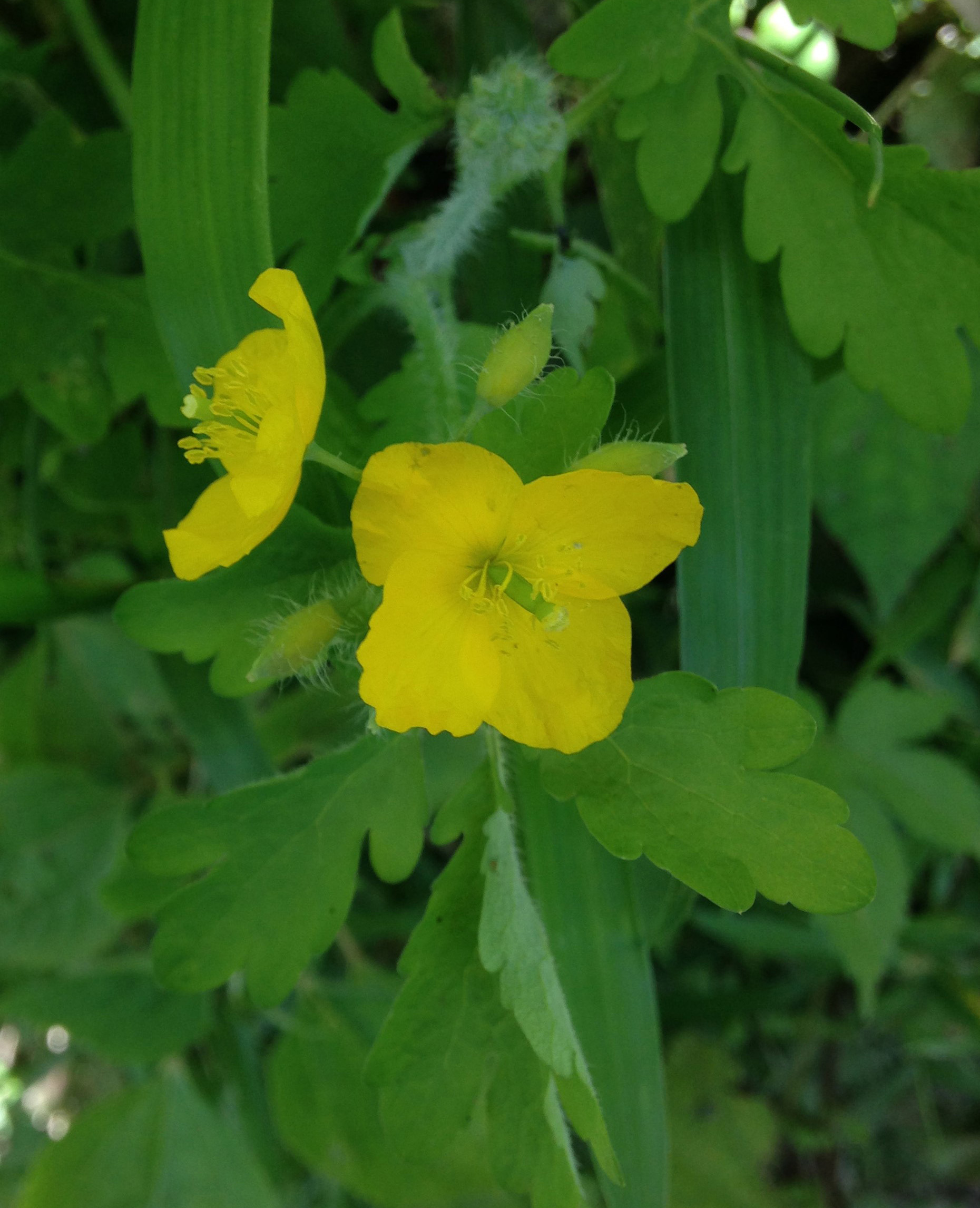
- Chelidonium asiaticum

Scientific classification
- Kingdom: Plantae
- Clade: Tracheophytes
- Clade: Angiosperms
- Clade: Eudicots
- Order: Ranunculales
- Family: Papaveraceae
- Subfamily: Papaveroideae
- Tribe: Chelidonieae
- Genus: Chelidonium; L.

Species
- 2-3, see text

= Chelidonium =

Genus of flowering plants in the poppy family

Chelidonium, commonly known as celandines, is a small genus of flowering plants in the poppy family, This genus is native to northern Africa and Eurasia, where they are widespread, ranging from western Europe to east Asia.

This genus consists of herbaceous perennials. Leaves are alternate and deeply lobed. They produce yellow flowers.

== Species ==
Chelidonium is a small genus, consisting of two accepted species. These are:

Image	Name	Distribution
	Chelidonium majus	Native to Europe, northern Africa, and western Asia
	Chelidonium asiaticum	Native to eastern Asia
