= Benzylisoquinoline alkaloids =

Derived from benzylisoquinoline

Benzylisoquinoline, building block of benzylisoquinoline alkaloids

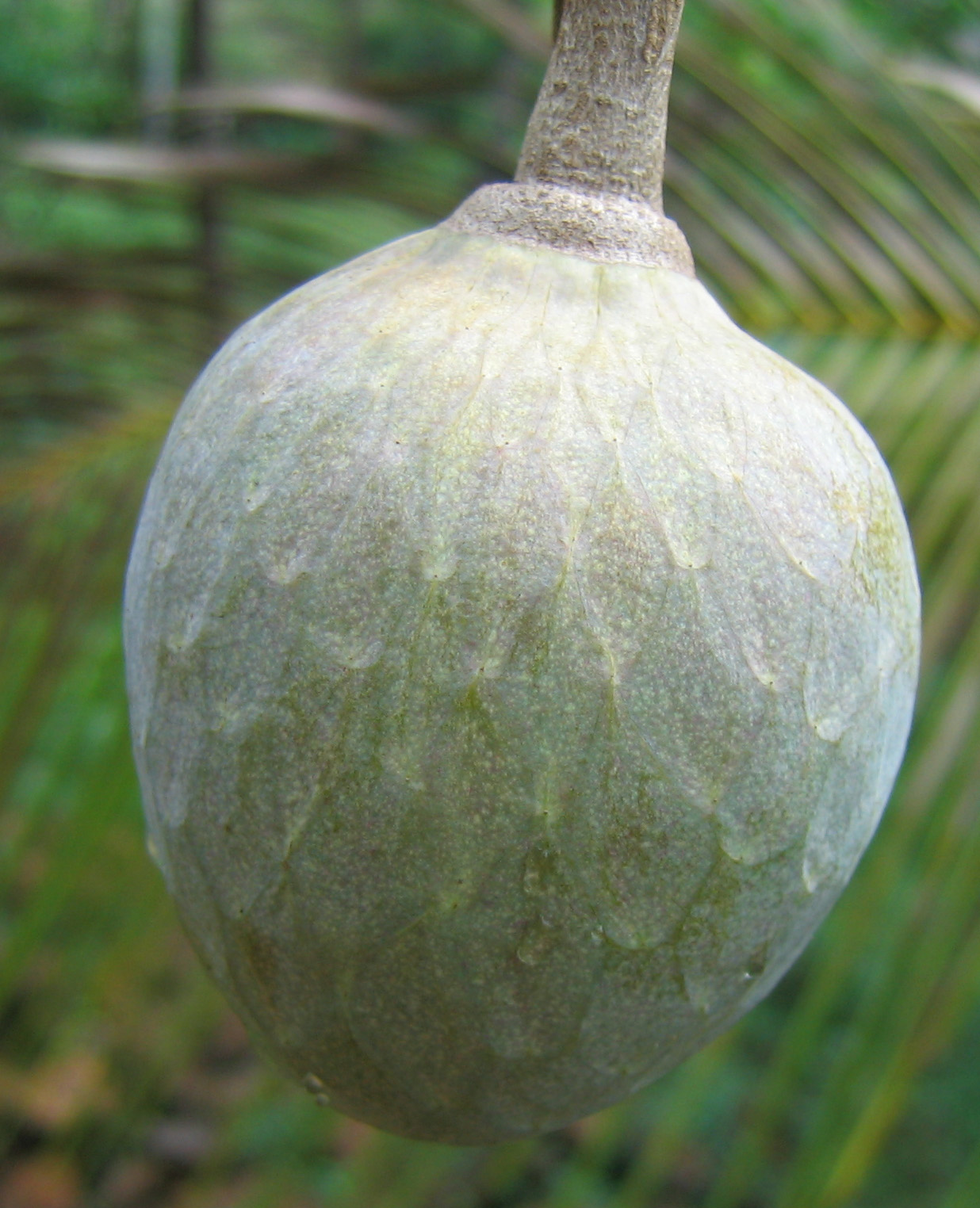
Fruit of Annona reticulata

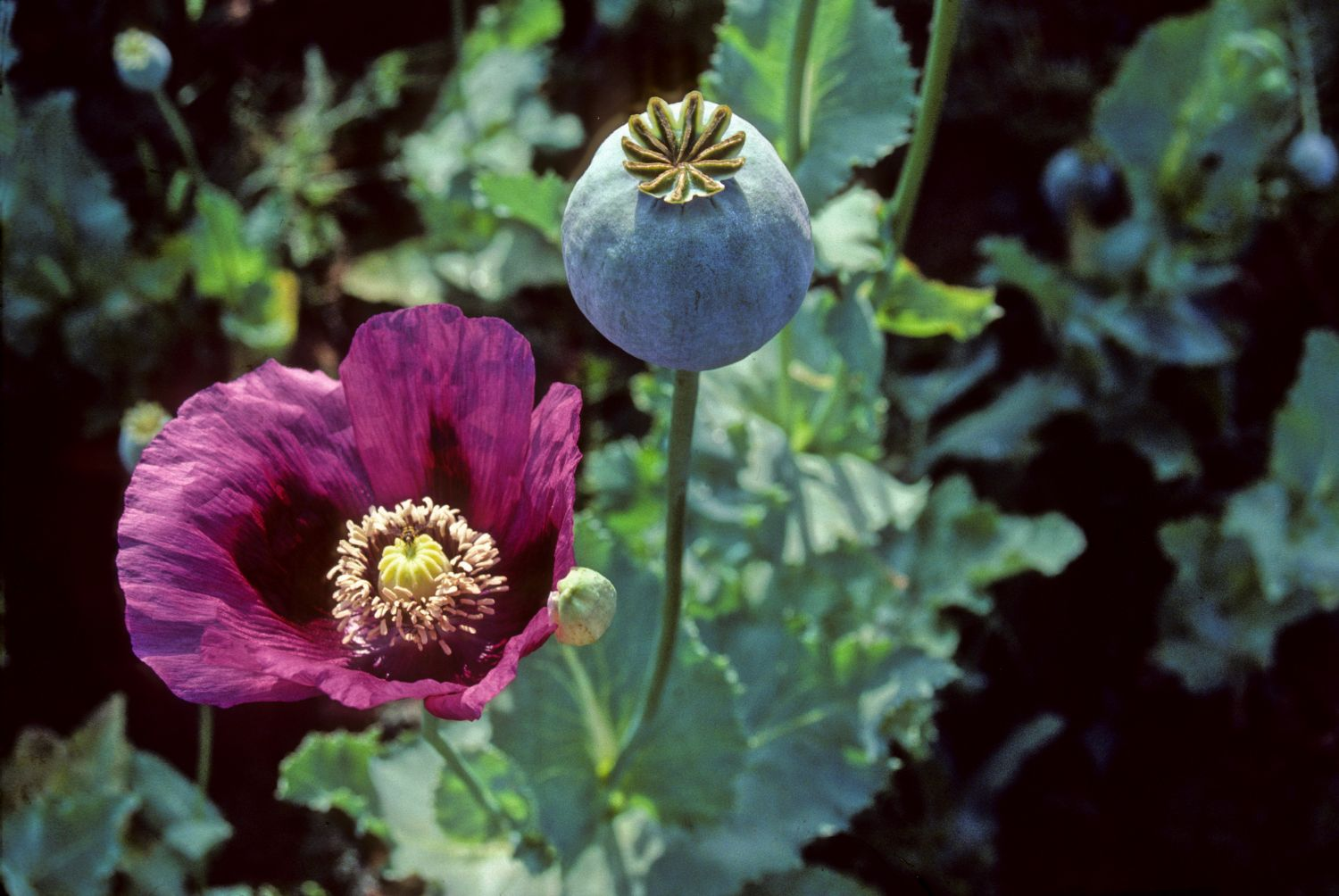
Flower and fruit of the opium poppy

The benzylisoquinoline alkaloids are natural products that can be classified as isoquinoline alkaloids and are derived from benzylisoquinoline. They also include the benzyl(tetrahydro)isoquinoline alkaloids.

(S)-stylopine is a central intermediate in the biosynthesis some such compounds.

== Occurrence ==
Benzylisoquinoline alkaloids are found in several plant families, including the poppy family (Papaveraceae), the annonaceae family, and the laurel family. Well-known representatives are primarily found in poppy plants, specifically those from which opium is derived, as well as in actaea. For instance, reticuline has been isolated from Annona reticulata.

== Known representatives ==
Over 2500 biologically active derivatives are known from the benzylisoquinoline alkaloids. Based on their structure, the compounds can be divided into numerous subgroups: the aporphines, the phthalideisoquinoline alkaloids, the morphinans, the protoberberine alkaloids, and the pavins. Among the known individual substances in this group are papaverine. Additional examples of compounds in this group are the benzyltetrahydroisoquinoline alkaloids reticuline and laudanosine.

Papaverine

(+)-Reticulin

(+)-Laudanosine

== Properties ==
Papaverine has vasodilator and muscle relaxant properties. Laudanosine acts as a tetanic poison.

== Biosynthesis ==
The biosynthesis of benzylisoquinoline alkaloids has been intensively studied. It begins with the amino acid tyrosine, which is converted to dopamine by hydroxylation and decarboxylation and to 4-hydroxyphenylacetaldehyde by oxidative deamination, respectively. These two compounds are converted into dopamine by enzyme Norcoclaurine synthase catalyzed condensation reaction to form the benzylisoquinoline backbone.

The benzylisoquinoline from this reaction may have different substituents, reticuline is an important intermediate.
