= Reticuline =

- (S)-(+)-reticuline

Names
- IUPAC name 3,10-Dimethoxy-8,8a-secoberbine-2,9-diol
- Systematic IUPAC name (1S)-1-[(3-Hydroxy-4-methoxyphenyl)methyl]-6-methoxy-2-methyl-1,2,3,4-tetrahydroisoquinolin-7-ol

Identifiers
CAS Number	(S): 485-19-8; (R): 3968-19-2
3D model (JSmol)	(S): Interactive image
Beilstein Reference	95671
ChEBI	(S): CHEBI:16718
ChEMBL	(S): ChEMBL235212
ChemSpider	(S): 388724
ECHA InfoCard	100.006.920
EC Number	(S): 207-611-3
KEGG	(S): C02105
PubChem CID	(S): 439653; (R): 440586
UNII	(S): X35Z551WT4
CompTox Dashboard (EPA)	(S): DTXSID001317199
- InChI: InChI=1S/C19H23NO4/c1-20-7-6-13-10-19(24-3)17(22)11-14(13)15(20)8-12-4-5-18(23-2)16(21)9-12/h4-5,9-11,15,21-22H,6-8H2,1-3H3/t15-/m0/s1 Key: BHLYRWXGMIUIHG-HNNXBMFYSA-N
- SMILES: (S): CN1CCC2=CC(=C(C=C2[C@@H]1CC3=CC(=C(C=C3)OC)O)O)OC

Properties
Chemical formula	C_{19}H_{23}NO_{4}
Molar mass	329.396 g·mol^{−1}
- Except where otherwise noted, data are given for materials in their standard state (at 25 °C [77 °F], 100 kPa). Infobox references

Reticuline is a tetrahydroisoquinoline alkaloid. It is also classified as a benzylisoquinoline alkaloid. It is produced in the opium poppy plant from the amino acid tyrosine, initially as (S)-reticuline, which is a precursor to other alkaloids, including papaverine and stylopine. Another large group of alkaloids including morphine are made after (S)-reticuline has been converted in the poppy to its enantiomer, (R)-reticuline.

== Occurrence ==
Reticuline is found in variety of plants including Papaver rhoeas, Lindera aggregata, Annona squamosa, and Ocotea fasciculata.

== Physiological effects ==
In rodents, reticuline possesses potent central nervous system depressing effects. It is the precursor of morphine and many other alkaloids. It is also toxic to dopaminergic neurons causing a form of atypical parkinsonism known as Guadeloupean Parkinsonism.

== Biosynthesis ==
Benzylisoquinoline alkaloids produced in the opium poppy are derived from the amino acid tyrosine. A sequence of enzyme-catalysed reactions produces (S)-norcoclaurine which goes through three further transformations to give (S)-3'-hydroxy-N-methylcoclaurine. (S)-reticuline is made when the enzyme 3'-hydroxy-N-methyl-(S)-coclaurine 4'-O-methyltransferase adds a methyl group using S-adenosyl methionine as its cofactor.

(S)-3'-hydroxy-N-methylcoclaurine
+ SAM
(S)-reticuline
+ SAH

Although (S)-reticuline can be metabolised into a diverse range of alkaloids including papaverine and stylopine, the route to morphinan alkaloids proceeds solely via its enantiomer, (R)-reticuline. This is formed by oxidation from the (S) isomer, giving the reticulinylium cation, followed by reduction back to reticuline but of opposite stereochemistry. In the opium poppy, this is accomplished by a fusion protein which combines the function of the enzymes 1,2-dehydroreticuline synthase and 1,2-dehydroreticulinium reductase (NADPH).

(S)-reticuline
+ NADPH
Synthase
O_{2}
2 H_{2}O
reticulinylium cation
+ NADP^{+}
reticulinylium cation
+ NADPH
Reductase
H^{+}
(R)-reticuline
+ NADP^{+}

This is an irreversible step in the biosynthesis of morphinan alkaloids.

== Metabolism ==
Reticuline oxidase uses (S)-reticuline and oxygen to produce the benzylisoquinoline scoulerine, with hydrogen peroxide as a by-product.

(S)-reticuline
O_{2}
H_{2}O_{2}
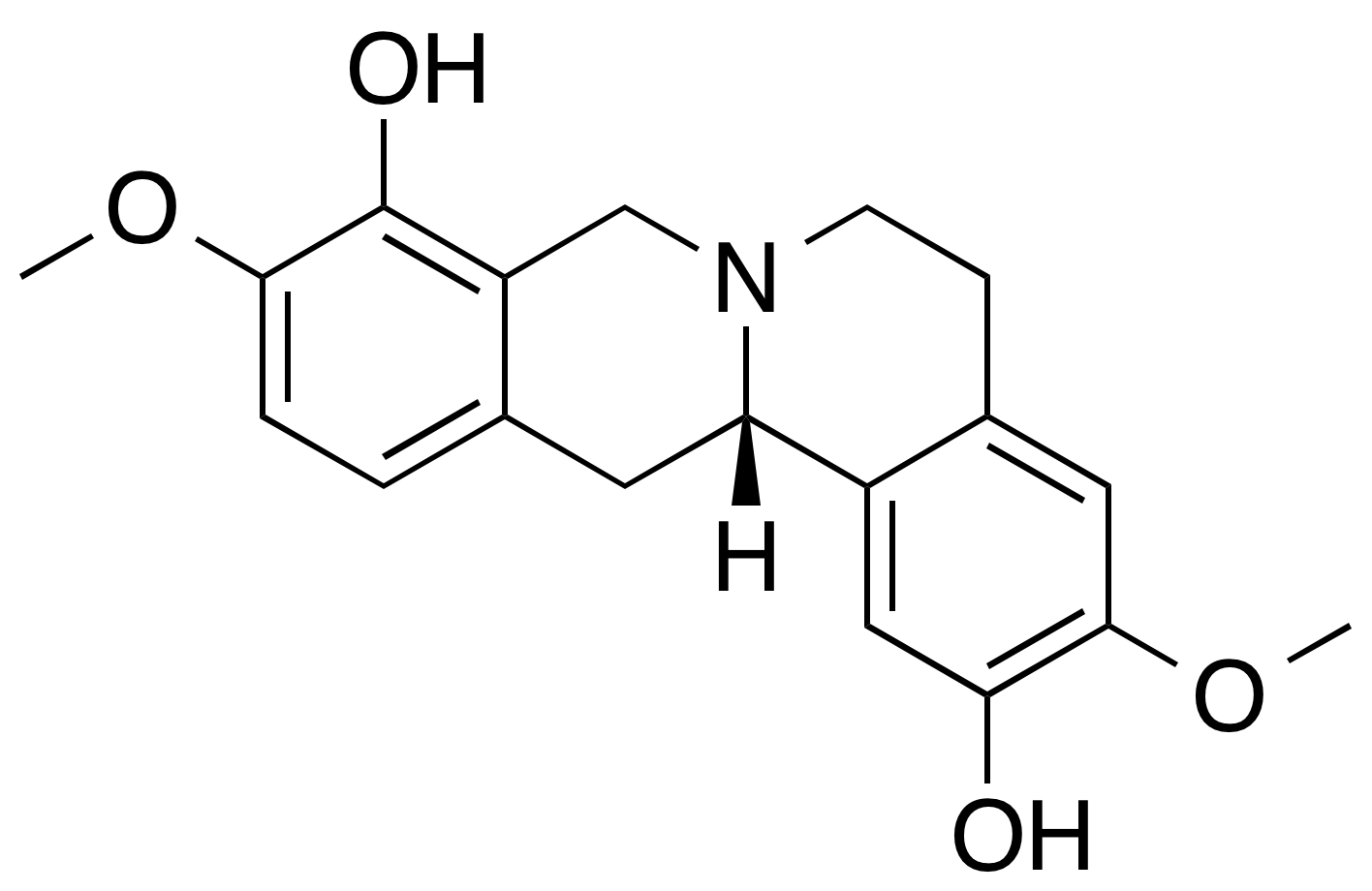
scoulerine

(S)-reticuline can undergo oxidative coupling to give (S)-corytuberine which is further metabolised to magnoflorine in Japanese goldthread.

(S)-reticuline
Synthase
(S)-corytuberine
Transferase
magnoflorine

Salutaridine synthase uses (R)-reticuline, NADPH, and oxygen to produce salutaridine.

(R)-reticuline
+ NADPH
O_{2}
2 H_{2}O
salutaridine
+ NADP^{+}

Salutaridine can then be transformed progressively to thebaine, oripavine, and morphine.
