= Tetrahydrocoptisine =

- (S)-tetrahydrocoptisine

Names
- IUPAC name 5,7,17,19-tetraoxa-13-azahexacyclo[11.11.0.0^{2,10}.0^{4,8}.0^{15,23}.0^{16,20}]tetracosa-2,4(8),9,15(23),16(20),21-hexaene
- Other names Stylopine

Identifiers
CAS Number	84-39-9
3D model (JSmol)	Interactive image
ChEBI	CHEBI:18285
ChemSpider	389482
KEGG	C05175
PubChem CID	440583
UNII	J0JS75Q12Z
CompTox Dashboard (EPA)	DTXSID50904180
- InChI: InChI=1S/C19H17NO4/c1-2-16-19(24-10-21-16)14-8-20-4-3-12-6-17-18(23-9-22-17)7-13(12)15(20)5-11(1)14/h1-2,6-7,15H,3-5,8-10H2/t15-/m0/s1 Key: UXYJCYXWJGAKQY-HNNXBMFYSA-N
- SMILES: c1cc2c(c3c1C[C@H]1c4cc5c(cc4CCN1C3)OCO5)OCO2

Properties
Chemical formula	C_{19}H_{17}NO_{4}
Molar mass	323.348 g·mol^{−1}
- Except where otherwise noted, data are given for materials in their standard state (at 25 °C [77 °F], 100 kPa). Infobox references

Tetrahydrocoptisine (also known as stylopine) is an alkaloid isolated from Corydalis species.

The (S) isomer is a major intermediate in the biosynthesis of diverse benzylisoquinoline alkaloids in higher plants. It is a "branch point", and further down the line in biosynthesis can lead to (1) the "protoberberine" alkaloid coptisine; (2) the benzo[c]phenanthridine alkaloids like sanguinarine, chelidonine, and mascarpine; (3) protopine, ochtosane, rhoeadine and phthalideisoquinoline type alkaloids.

== Biosynthesis ==
The (S)-isomer of tetrahydrocoptisine is produced when the enzyme (S)-stylopine synthase acts on (S)-cheilanthifoline to form a second methylenedioxy ring:

cheilanthifoline

+ NADPH
O_{2}
2 H_{2}O

(S)-tetrahydrocoptisine

+ NADP^{+}

== Metabolism ==
Tetrahydrocoptisine is converted to coptisine by an oxidation reaction catalysed by the enzyme tetrahydroberberine oxidase.

tetrahydrocoptisine

+ H^{+}
2 O_{2}
2 H_{2}O_{2}

coptisine

Alternatively, it can be converted into protopine in two steps. The first is a methylation reaction by the enzyme (S)-tetrahydroprotoberberine N-methyltransferase using the cofactor, S-adenosyl methionine (SAM). This transfers a methyl group, giving S-adenosyl-L-homocysteine (SAH).

(S)-tetrahydrocoptisine

+ SAM

N-methylstylopine

+ SAH

Then the product, (S)-cis-N-methylstylopine, is oxidised by the enzyme methyltetrahydroprotoberberine 14-monooxygenase:

(S)-cis-N-methylstylopine

+ NADPH
O_{2}
H_{2}O

Protopine

+ NADP^{+}
