= Benzylisoquinoline =

Names
- Preferred IUPAC name 1-Benzylisoquinoline
- Systematic IUPAC name 1-(Phenylmethyl)isoquinoline

Identifiers
CAS Number	6907-59-1
3D model (JSmol)	Interactive image
ChemSpider	21830
PubChem CID	23345
UNII	UF5CSU3HA6
CompTox Dashboard (EPA)	DTXSID90219124
- InChI: InChI=1S/C16H13N/c1-2-6-13(7-3-1)12-16-15-9-5-4-8-14(15)10-11-17-16/h1-11H,12H2 Key: IZTUINVRJSCOIR-UHFFFAOYSA-N
- SMILES: c13ccccc3ccnc1Cc2ccccc2

Properties
Chemical formula	C_{16}H_{13}N
Molar mass	219.28112 g/mol
- Except where otherwise noted, data are given for materials in their standard state (at 25 °C [77 °F], 100 kPa). verify (what is ?) Infobox references

Substitution of the heterocycle isoquinoline at the C1 position by a benzyl group provides 1‑benzylisoquinoline, the most widely examined of the numerous benzylisoquinoline structural isomers. The 1-benzylisoquinoline moiety can be identified within numerous compounds of pharmaceutical interest, such as moxaverine; but most notably it is found within the structures of a wide variety of plant natural products, collectively referred to as benzylisoquinoline alkaloids. This class is exemplified in part by the following compounds: papaverine, noscapine, codeine, morphine, apomorphine, berberine, tubocurarine.

== Biosynthesis ==
(S)-Norcoclaurine (higenamine) has been identified as the central 1-benzyl-tetrahydro-isoquinoline precursor from which numerous complex biosynthetic pathways eventually emerge. These pathways collectively lead to the structurally disparate compounds comprising the broad classification of plant natural products referred to as benzylisoquinoline alkaloids (BIA), which have been comprehensively discussed by Hagel. The biosynthesis of (S)-norcoclaurine, which is catalyzed by (S)-norcoclaurine synthase, is accomplished by the stereoselective condensation of dopamine and 4-hydroxyphenylacetaldehyde (4-HPAA); each of these compounds is prepared by multiple enzymatic transformations from L-tyrosine.

It is of interest to note that early studies initially identified norlaudanosoline (tetrahydropapaveroline) as the purported central precursor for the biosynthesis of BIAs. However, more than two decades later it was finely unequivocally established that (S)-norcoclaurine was the central precursor for the biosynthesis of the structurally diverse BIAs.

== Examples of benzylisoquinoline alkaloids ==
Papaverine

Noscapine

Apomorphine (one additional ring closure)

Morphine (two additional ring closures)

Berberine (one additional ring closure with incorporated N-methyl)

Tubocurarine (composed of two benzylisoquinoline units)

== See also ==
- Aminosteroid
- Gallamine
- Morphinan
- Indole
- Indolizidine
