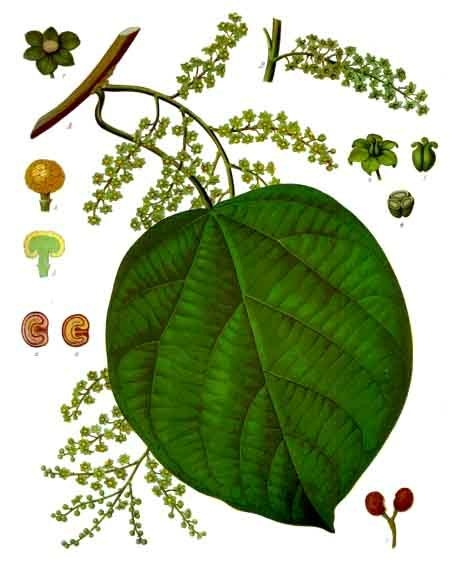
- Indian berry (Anamirta cocculus)

Scientific classification
- Kingdom: Plantae
- Clade: Tracheophytes
- Clade: Angiosperms
- Clade: Eudicots
- Order: Ranunculales
- Family: Menispermaceae
- Genus: Anamirta
- Species: A. cocculus

Binomial name
- Anamirta cocculus (L.) Wight & Arn., 1834

Synonyms
- Anamirta jucunda Miers; Anamirta paniculata Colebr.; Anamirta populifera (DC.) Miers; Anamirta racemosa Colebr. ex Steud.; Cocculus indicus Royle; Menispermum heteroclitum Roxb.; Menispermum monadelphum Roxb. ex Wight & Arn.

= Anamirta cocculus =

Climbing plant

Anamirta cocculus (Marathi: काकमारी) is a Southeast Asian and Indian climbing plant. It is the source of picrotoxin, a poisonous compound with stimulant properties.

The plant is large-stemmed (up to 10 cm in diameter); the bark is "corky gray" with white wood. The "small, yellowish-white, sweet-scented" flowers vary between 6 and 10 millimeters across; the fruit produced is a drupe, "about 1 cm in diameter when dry".

== Chemical substances ==
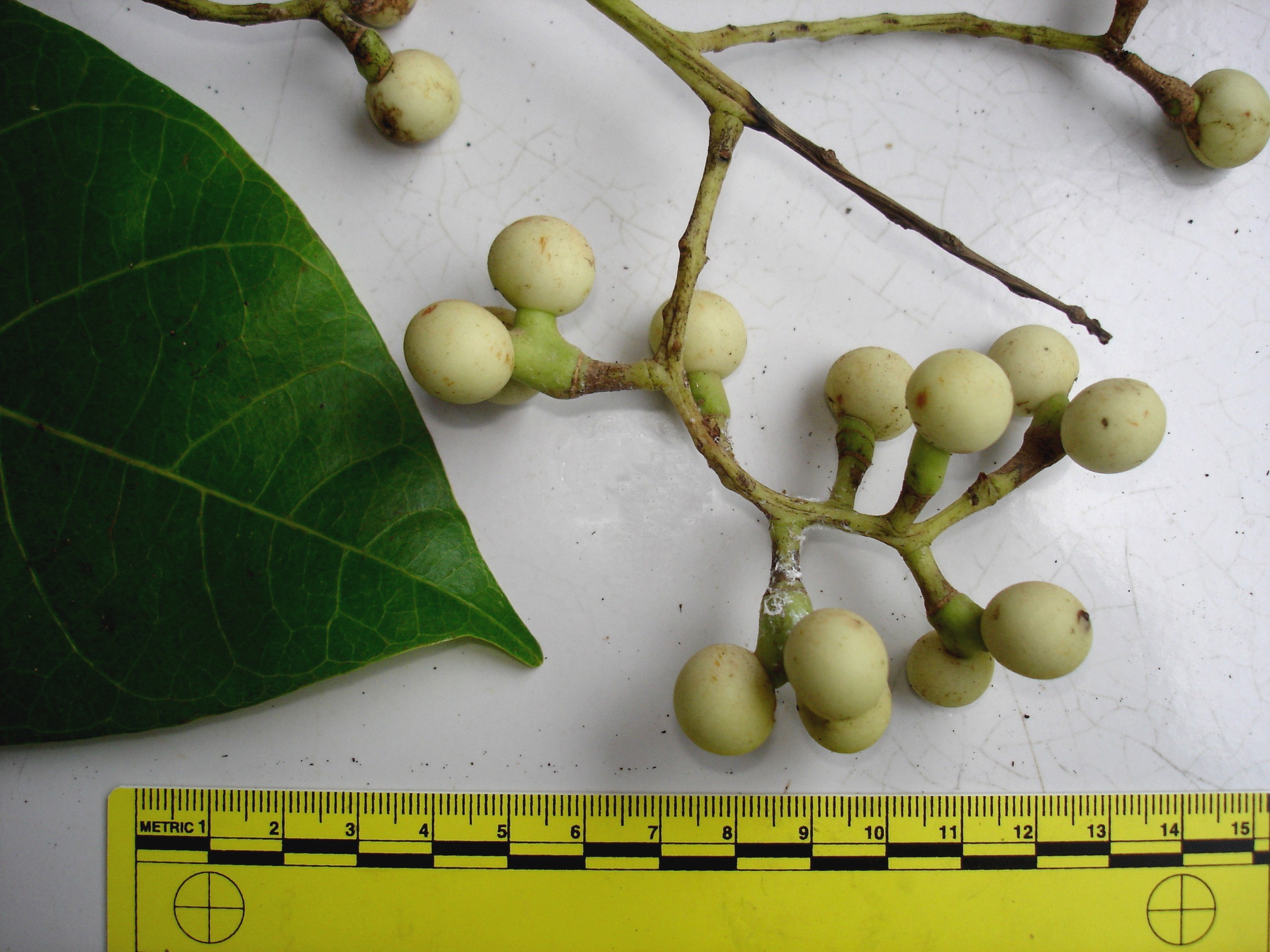
Newly harvested fruits

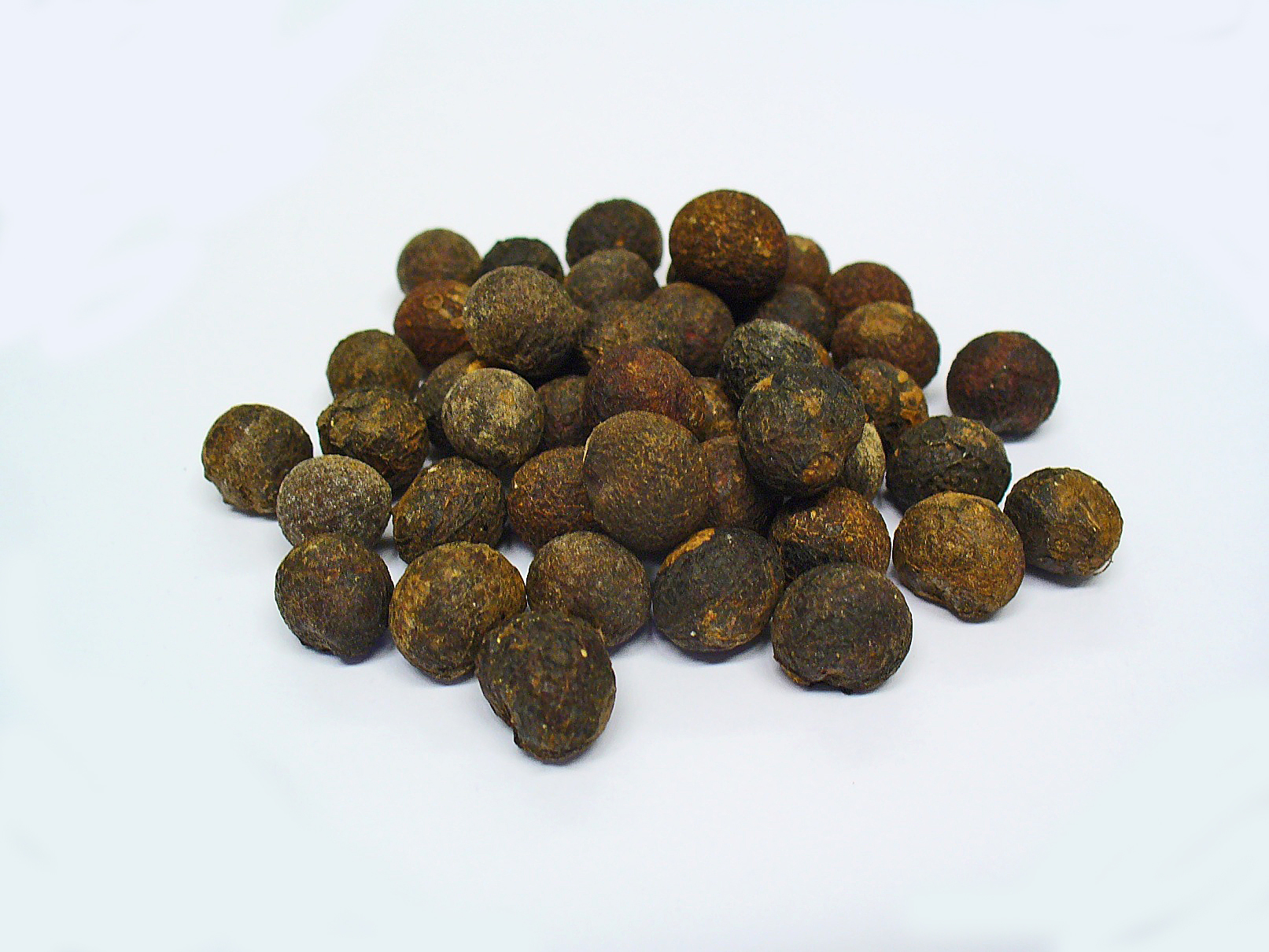
Dried fruits

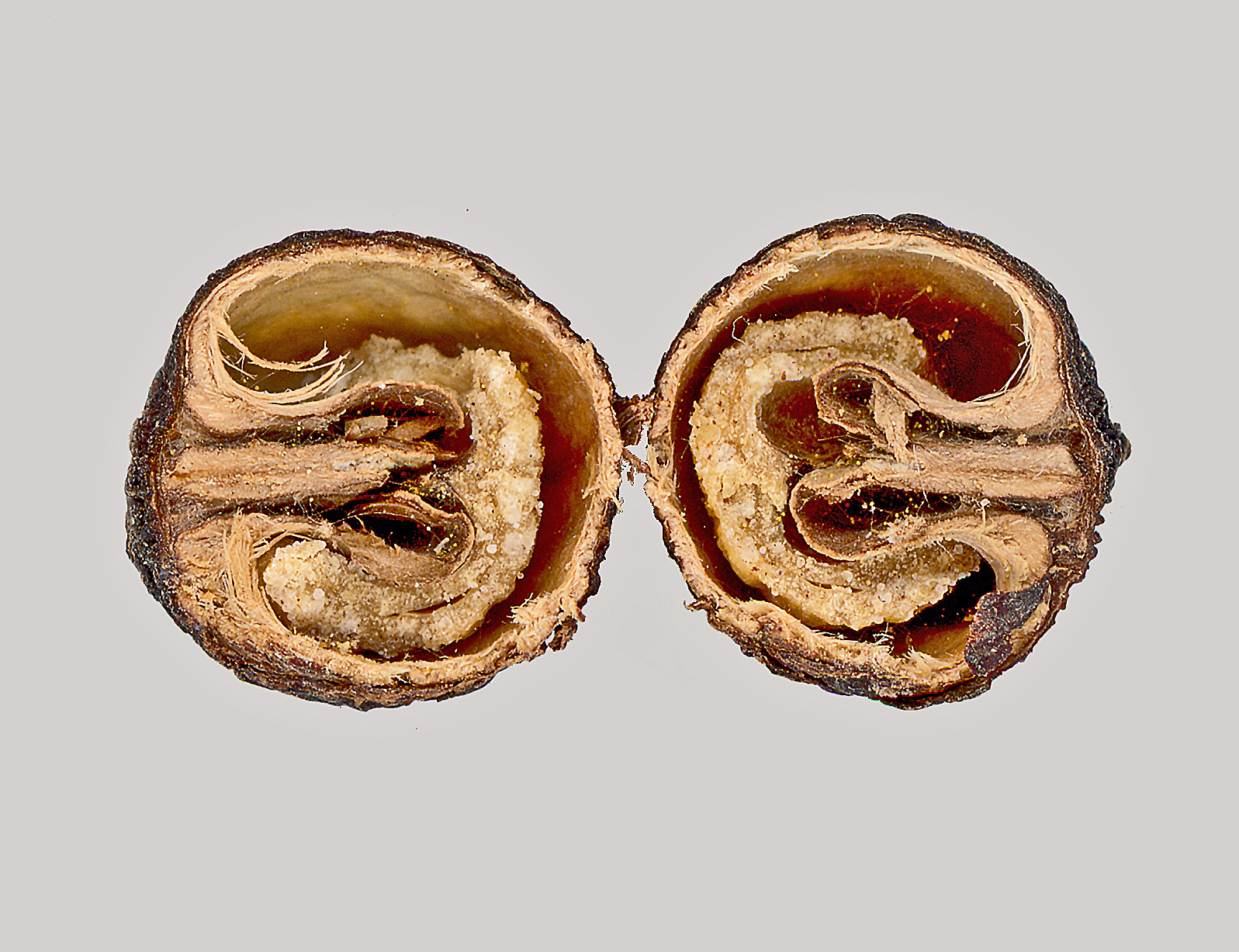
Dried fruit: Longitudinal section

The stem and the roots contain quaternary alkaloids, such as berberine, palmatine, magnoflorine and columbamine. The seeds deliver picrotoxin, a sesquiterpene, while the seed shells contain the tertiary alkaloids menispermine and paramenispermine.

== Uses ==
Its crushed seeds are an effective pediculicide (anti-lice) and are also traditionally used to stun fish or as a pesticide. In pharmacology, it is known as Cocculus Indicus.

Although poisonous, hard multum is a preparation made from Cocculus Indicus, etc., once used (by 19th century brewers) to impart a more intoxicating quality ("giddiness") to beer than provided by the alcoholic content alone. Charles Dickens referred to those engaging in such practices as "brewers and beer-sellers of low degree,... who do not understand the wholesome policy of selling wholesome beverage." Although appearing in many homeopathic volumes and at least two brewers' guides, the use of such preparations was outlawed in England, during the mid-19th century, with fines of £500 for sale and £200 for use of the drug.

The wood of the plant is used for fuel and carving.

== Common names ==
The English common names are Indian berry, fishberry, or Levant nut (both referring to the dried fruit, and to the plant by synecdoche) and coca de Levante in Spanish; it is variously known as ligtang, aria (Mindanao), bayati (Tagalog), and variations thereof throughout its natural distribution (the Philippines, East India, Malaysia, and New Guinea).

The name "fishberry" comes from the use of the dried fruit as a method of fishing, in which the fish is "stupified and captured"; this method, however, is considered "unsportsmanlike".
