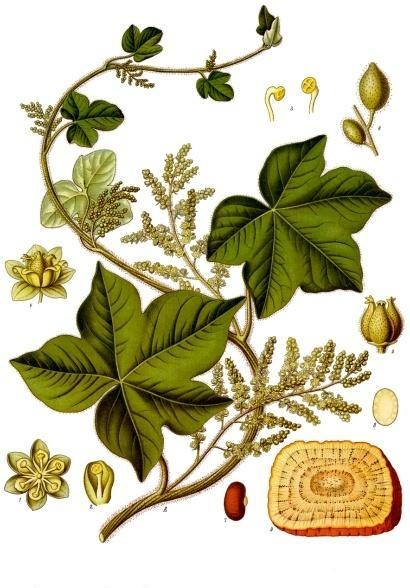

Scientific classification
- Kingdom: Plantae
- Clade: Tracheophytes
- Clade: Angiosperms
- Clade: Eudicots
- Order: Ranunculales
- Family: Menispermaceae
- Genus: Jateorhiza
- Species: J. palmata

Binomial name
- Jateorhiza palmata (Lam.) Miers

Synonyms
- Cocculus palmatus (Lam.) DC.; Jateorhiza columba (Roxb.) Oliv.; Jateorhiza miersii Oliv.; Menispermum columba Roxb.; Menispermum palmatum Lam.

= Jateorhiza palmata =

Species of flowering plant

Jateorhiza palmata (calumba) is a perennial climbing plant from East Africa. It contains isoquinoline alkaloids, including columbamine and is used mainly as a bitter tonic especially in cases of anorexia nervosa. It contains no tannins, hence it can be safely used in iron preparations for the treatment of anaemia without the fear of precipitation resulted from in vitro interaction.

== Description ==
Tall, dioecious twining perennial vine; often reaching the tops of trees. The annual stems, one or two from each root, have hairs with glandular tips and have large bright green membranous leaves which are palmate, alternate and long petioled. The flowers are insignificant and greenish white. The female flower is followed by moon-shaped stone in a drupe. Male flowers are in 30 centimetres (12 in) long panicles. The tuberous root is large and fleshy, about 3–8 centimetres (1.2–3.1 in) in diameter with a thick bark. Transverse section is yellowish, outside greyish brown. Taste is muscilagenous and very bitter.
