= Palmatine =

Names
- IUPAC name 2,3,9,10-Tetramethoxy-5,6-dihydroisoquinolino[2,1-b]isoquinolin-7-ium
- Other names Berbericinine

Identifiers
CAS Number	3486-67-7
3D model (JSmol)	Interactive image
ChEMBL	ChEMBL274189
ChemSpider	5224
KEGG	C05315
PubChem CID	19009
UNII	G50C034217
CompTox Dashboard (EPA)	DTXSID9048065
- InChI: InChI=1/C21H25NO4/c1-23-18-6-5-13-9-17-15-11-20(25-3)19(24-2)10-14(15)7-8-22(17)12-16(13)21(18)26-4/h5-6,10-11,17H,7-9,12H2,1-4H3 Key: AEQDJSLRWYMAQI-UHFFFAOYAT
- SMILES: O(c1c4c(ccc1OC)CC3c2c(cc(OC)c(OC)c2)CCN3C4)C

Properties
Chemical formula	C_{21}H_{22}NO_{4}^{+}
Molar mass	352.409 g·mol^{−1}
Density	1.23 g/cm^{3}
- Except where otherwise noted, data are given for materials in their standard state (at 25 °C [77 °F], 100 kPa). Infobox references

Palmatine is a protoberberine alkaloid found in several plants including Coptis chinensis (Rhizoma coptidis, chinese goldthread), Corydalis yanhusuo, Tinospora cordifolia (gurjo, heart-leaved moonseed), Tinospora sagittata, Phellodendron amurense (amur cork tree), and Stephania yunnanensis.

It is the major component of the protoberberine extract from Enantia chlorantha.

It has been studied for its potential use in the treatment of jaundice, dysentery, hypertension, inflammation, and liver-related diseases. This compound also has weak in vitro activity against flavivirus.

== Biosynthesis ==
The biosynthesis of palmatine starts with tyrosine and proceeds via (S)-reticuline in a pathway leading to benzylisoquinoline alkaloids. The final step is catalysed by the enzyme tetrahydroberberine oxidase, which oxidises tetrahydropalmatine:

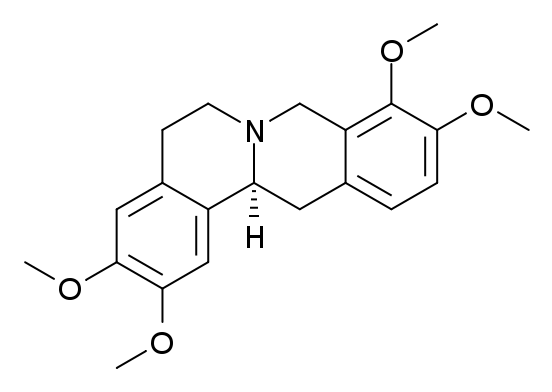
tetrahydropalmatine
+ H^{+}
2 O_{2}
2 H_{2}O_{2}
palmatine

Alternatively, a methylation reaction catalysed by columbamine O-methyltransferase produces palmatine from columbamine. The methyl group comes from the cofactor, S-adenosyl methionine (SAM). This enzyme was characterised from Berberis wilsoniae.

columbamine
+ SAM
palmatine
+ SAH

== Metabolism ==
In Corydalis cava, palmatine is converted to corydaline by the enzyme corydaline synthase. The methyl group comes from SAM and the reaction also requires nicotinamide adenine dinucleotide phosphate (NADPH).

palmatine
+ SAM
+ 2 NADPH
H^{+}
corydaline
+ SAH
+ 2 NADP^{+}

== Pharmacology ==
=== Neuroprotective activity ===
Palmatine is an inhibitor of acetylcholinesterase (AChE), butyrylcholinesterase (BChE) and neuraminidase-1 (NA-1), and has potential applications in the therapy of Alzheimer's disease. It was found that the positively charged nitrogen on palmatine binds in the gorge of active sire of AChE.

Research show that palmatine had antidepressant effect. It was achieved by regulating brain catalase levels, monoamine oxidase-A (MAO-A) activity, lipid peroxidation, plasma nitrite and corticosterone levels.

=== Regulating blood lipid activity ===
Palmatine achieved hypoglycemic effects by inducing insulin release and insulin-mimicking activity. In addition, studies found that palmatine also inhibited the activity of lens aldose reductase, sucrase and maltase. In vivo research showed that palmatine reduced serum total cholesterol (TC) and triglycerides (TG) and increased serum high-density lipoprotein cholesterol.

=== Anticancer activity ===
Research showed that palmatine had broad anti-cancer activity. Palmatine had significant growth inhibitory effects on seven human cancer cell lines: 7701QGY, SMMC7721, HepG2, CEM, CEM/VCR, K III and Lewis. In addition, palmatine also had anti-cancer activity on MCF-7, U251, KB, CHOK-1, HT-29 and SiHacell lines. Palmatine induced apoptosis in human skin epithelial carcinoma cells (A431) in a concentration- and time-dependent manner via damaging severely to DNA and inhibiting the activity of Bcl-2 protein. In addition, palmatine can inhibit the proliferation and infiltration of cancer cells.

=== Antibacterial and antiviral activity ===
Palmitine has inhibitory effect on Gram-positive bacteria which is significantly stronger than that on Gram-negative bacteria, and 9-O-substituted palmatine derivatives exhibited stronger antibacterial activity.

=== Anti-inflammatory activity ===
Studies have shown that palmatine can decrease the production of pro-inflammatory factors and increase the production of anti-inflammatory factors.

=== Other pharmacological activity ===
Studies have shown that palmatine chave antioxidant activity, had a protective effect on gastric ulcer, derivatives of palmatine were more effective against ulcerative colitis, including low cytotoxicity to intestinal epithelial cells. In addition, palmatine might have the antiarrhythmic effect, and provide protection from myocardial ischemia-reperfusion injury.

== Toxicity ==
A large number of studies have shown that palmatine has a complex effect on the metabolism of enzymes in the liver, and that palmatine has significant DNA toxicity. However, some 9-O-substituted palmatine derivatives exhibited less toxic than palmatine. In addition, palmatine had higher affinity to nucleic acids than serum proteins, which make them suitable candidates for delivery by serum proteins.

== See also ==
- Berberine
- Jatrorrhizine
- Phellodendrine
