= Columbamine =

Organic chemical

Names
- IUPAC name 3,9,10-Trimethoxy-5,6-dihydroisoquinolino[2,1-b]isoquinolin-7-ium-2-ol
- Other names Dehydroisocorypalmine

Identifiers
CAS Number	3621-36-1
3D model (JSmol)	Interactive image
ChEBI	CHEBI:15920
ChEMBL	ChEMBL400345
ChemSpider	65261
KEGG	C01795
PubChem CID	72310
UNII	7T4808FEJW
CompTox Dashboard (EPA)	DTXSID80189766
- InChI: InChI=1S/C20H19NO4/c1-23-18-5-4-12-8-16-14-10-17(22)19(24-2)9-13(14)6-7-21(16)11-15(12)20(18)25-3/h4-5,8-11H,6-7H2,1-3H3/p+1 Key: YYFOFDHQVIODOQ-UHFFFAOYSA-O
- SMILES: COC1=C(C2=C[N+]3=C(C=C2C=C1)C4=CC(=C(C=C4CC3)OC)O)OC

Properties
Chemical formula	C_{20}H_{20}NO_{4}^{+}
Molar mass	338.382 g·mol^{−1}
Melting point	280–282 °C (536–540 °F; 553–555 K) (chloride salt)
- Except where otherwise noted, data are given for materials in their standard state (at 25 °C [77 °F], 100 kPa). Infobox references

Columbamine is an isoquinoline alkaloid made up of four rings, two of which contain nitrogen. It is related to berberine but without its methylenedioxy group. Columbamine is also called dehydroisocorypalmine. It has usually been isolated and characterised as its chloride salt.

== Occurrence ==
Columbamine has been found in several Berberis species, Coptis chinensis and Jateorhiza palmata.

== Biosynthesis ==
The biosynthesis of columbamine starts with tyrosine and proceeds via (S)-reticuline in a pathway leading to benzylisoquinoline alkaloids. The final step is catalysed by the enzyme tetrahydroberberine oxidase, which oxidises (S)-isocorypalmine:

(S)-isocorypalmine
+ H^{+}
2 O_{2}
2 H_{2}O_{2}
columbamine

== Metabolism ==
Columbamine is converted to berberine by the enzyme columbamine oxidase:

2 columbamine
O_{2}
2 H_{2}O
2
berberine

A methylation reaction catalysed by columbamine O-methyltransferase produces palmatine. The methyl group comes from the cofactor, S-adenosyl methionine (SAM). This enzyme was characterised from Berberis wilsoniae.

columbamine
+ SAM
palmatine
+ SAH
