= Columbamine O-methyltransferase =

Enzyme

Identifiers
- EC no.: 2.1.1.118
- CAS no.: 105843-76-3

Databases
- IntEnz: IntEnz view
- BRENDA: BRENDA entry
- ExPASy: NiceZyme view
- KEGG: KEGG entry
- MetaCyc: metabolic pathway
- PRIAM: profile
- PDB structures: RCSB PDB PDBe PDBsum
- Gene Ontology: AmiGO / QuickGO
Search
- PMC: articles
- PubMed: articles
- NCBI: proteins

Columbamine O-methyltransferase (EC 2.1.1.118) is an enzyme that catalyzes the chemical reaction

columbamine
+ SAM
palmatine
+ SAH

This is a methylation reaction in which the benzylisoquinoline alkaloid, columbamine, is converted to palmatine. The methyl group comes from the cofactor, S-adenosyl methionine (SAM), which becomes S-adenosyl-L-homocysteine (SAH). The enzyme was characterised from Berberis wilsoniae.

This enzyme belongs to the family of transferases, specifically those transferring one-carbon group methyltransferases. The systematic name of this enzyme class is S-adenosyl-L-methionine:columbamine O-methyltransferase. It is part of the alkaloid biosynthesis pathway.
