= Corydaline synthase =

Enzyme

Identifiers
- EC no.: 2.1.1.147
- CAS no.: 155807-67-3

Databases
- IntEnz: IntEnz view
- BRENDA: BRENDA entry
- ExPASy: NiceZyme view
- KEGG: KEGG entry
- MetaCyc: metabolic pathway
- PRIAM: profile
- PDB structures: RCSB PDB PDBe PDBsum
- Gene Ontology: AmiGO / QuickGO
Search
- PMC: articles
- PubMed: articles
- NCBI: proteins

Corydaline synthase (EC 2.1.1.147) is an enzyme that catalyzes the chemical reaction

palmatine
+ SAM
+ 2 NADPH
H^{+}
corydaline
+ SAH
+ 2 NADP^{+}

This is a methylation reaction in which palmatine is converted to its corydaline. The methyl group comes from the cofactor, S-adenosyl methionine (SAM), which becomes S-adenosyl-L-homocysteine (SAH). The reaction also requires nicotinamide adenine dinucleotide phosphate (NADPH). The enzyme was characterised from Corydalis cava.

This enzyme belongs to the family of transferases, specifically those transferring one-carbon group methyltransferases. The systematic name of this enzyme class is S-adenosyl-L-methionine:protoberberine 13-C-methyltransferase.
