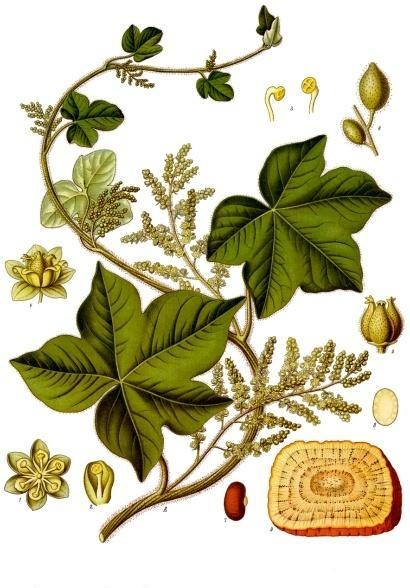
- Jateorhiza palmata

Scientific classification
- Kingdom: Plantae
- Clade: Tracheophytes
- Clade: Angiosperms
- Clade: Eudicots
- Order: Ranunculales
- Family: Menispermaceae
- Genus: Jateorhiza; Miers

Species
- See text

Synonyms
- Heterotypic Synonyms: Colombo Bosc

= Jateorhiza =

Genus of flowering plants

Jateorhiza is a genus of flowering plants in the family Menispermaceae.

It is native to Cabinda Province, Cameroon, the Central African Republic, Democratic Republic of the Congo, Gabon, the Gulf of Guinea Islands, Kenya, Malawi, Mauritius, Mozambique, Nigeria, the Republic of the Congo, Tanzania, and Zimbabwe.

== Species ==
Accepted species in the genus includ:

- Jateorhiza macrantha (Hook.f.) Exell & Mendonça
- Jateorhiza palmata (Lam.) Miers
