= Columbamine oxidase =

Class of enzymes

Identifiers
- EC no.: 1.21.3.2
- CAS no.: 95329-18-3

Databases
- IntEnz: IntEnz view
- BRENDA: BRENDA entry
- ExPASy: NiceZyme view
- KEGG: KEGG entry
- MetaCyc: metabolic pathway
- PRIAM: profile
- PDB structures: RCSB PDB PDBe PDBsum
- Gene Ontology: AmiGO / QuickGO
Search
- PMC: articles
- PubMed: articles
- NCBI: proteins

Columbamine oxidase (EC 1.21.3.2) is an enzyme that catalyzes the chemical reaction that converts the benzylisoquinoline alkaloid, columbamine, into berberine.

2
columbamine
O_{2}
2 H_{2}O
2
berberine

The two substrates of this enzyme are columbamine and oxygen. Its products are berberine and water.

This enzyme is an oxidoreductases, specifically those acting on X-H and Y-H to form an X-Y bond with oxygen as acceptor. The systematic name of this enzyme class is columbamine:oxygen oxidoreductase (cyclizing). This enzyme is also called berberine synthase. This enzyme participates in alkaloid biosynthesis. It employs one cofactor, iron.
