= Tetrahydroberberine oxidase =

Type of enzyme

tetrahydroberberine oxidase

Identifiers
- EC no.: 1.3.3.8
- CAS no.: 114705-00-9

Databases
- IntEnz: IntEnz view
- BRENDA: BRENDA entry
- ExPASy: NiceZyme view
- KEGG: KEGG entry
- MetaCyc: metabolic pathway
- PRIAM: profile
- PDB structures: RCSB PDB PDBe PDBsum
- Gene Ontology: AmiGO / QuickGO
Search
- PMC: articles
- PubMed: articles
- NCBI: proteins

(S)-Tetrahydroberberine oxidase (EC 1.3.3.8) is an enzyme that catalyzes the final transformation in the biosynthesis of berberine, a quaternary benzylisoquinoline alkaloid of the protoberberine structural subgroup. This reaction pathway catalyzes the four-electron oxidation of (S)-tetrahydroberberine (also known as (S)-canadine) in the presence of oxygen to produce berberine and hydrogen peroxide.

tetrahydroberberine
+ H^{+}
2 O_{2}
2 H_{2}O_{2}
berberine

This enzyme belongs to the family known as oxidoreductases, in this instance the CH-CH moiety acts as the electron donor with oxygen acting as the electron acceptor. The systematic name of this enzyme is (S)-tetrahydroberberine:oxygen oxidoreductase; but it is also known as (S)-THB oxidase, tetrahydroberberine oxidase, and decreasingly, as (S)-tetrahydroprotoberberine oxidase.

Other quaternary benzylisoquinoline alkaloids can be produced by this enzyme, provided that their precursor has (S} configuration at the centre next to the nitrogen. For example, (S)-isocorypalmine is oxidised to columbamine; tetrahydropalmatine to palmatine, and tetrahydropapaverine to papaverine.

(S)-isocorypalmine
+ H^{+}
2 O_{2}
2 H_{2}O_{2}
columbamine
