= Corydaline =

Names
- IUPAC name 2,3,9,10-Tetramethoxy-13α-methyl-13aβ-berbine
- Systematic IUPAC name (13S,13aR)-2,3,9,10-Tetramethoxy-13-methyl-5,8,13,13a-tetrahydro-6H-isoquinolino[3,2-a]isoquinoline

Identifiers
CAS Number	518-69-4
3D model (JSmol)	Interactive image; Interactive image
ChemSpider	91533
KEGG	C15530
PubChem CID	101301
UNII	08N392L8VX
CompTox Dashboard (EPA)	DTXSID90199735
- InChI: InChI=1S/C22H27NO4/c1-13-15-6-7-18(24-2)22(27-5)17(15)12-23-9-8-14-10-19(25-3)20(26-4)11-16(14)21(13)23/h6-7,10-11,13,21H,8-9,12H2,1-5H3/t13-,21+/m0/s1 Key: VRSRXLJTYQVOHC-YEJXKQKISA-N; InChI=1/C22H27NO4/c1-13-15-6-7-18(24-2)22(27-5)17(15)12-23-9-8-14-10-19(25-3)20(26-4)11-16(14)21(13)23/h6-7,10-11,13,21H,8-9,12H2,1-5H3/t13-,21+/m0/s1 Key: VRSRXLJTYQVOHC-YEJXKQKIBZ
- SMILES: C[C@@H]1[C@@H]2C3=CC(=C(C=C3CCN2CC4=C1C=CC(=C4OC)OC)OC)OC; C[C@@H]1[C@@H]2C3=CC(=C(C=C3CCN2CC4=C1C=CC(=C4OC)OC)OC)OC

Properties
Chemical formula	C_{22}H_{27}NO_{4}
Molar mass	369.461 g·mol^{−1}
- Except where otherwise noted, data are given for materials in their standard state (at 25 °C [77 °F], 100 kPa). Infobox references

Corydaline is an acetylcholinesterase inhibitor isolated from Corydalis yanhusuo.

Corydaline is a pharmacologically active isoquinoline alkaloid isolated from Corydalis tubers. It also has diverse biological activities. It exhibits the antiacetylcholinesterase(AChE; IC_{50} = 15 μM), antiallergic, antinociceptive, and gastric emptying activities.

Corydaline exhibited strong nematocidal activity, showed little cytotoxicity and represents a potential treatment for Strongyloidiasis. Corydaline is nematocidal against S. ratti and S. venezuelensis third instar larvae with 50% paralysis (PC_{50}) values of 18 and 30 μM, respectively.

Corydaline exhibits gastrointestinal modulatory, antinociceptive, anti-allergic, and anti-parasitic activities. Corydaline (1 and 3 mg/kg) increases gastric emptying in rat models of apomorphine- and laparotomy-induced delayed gastric emptying. Corydaline is currently in clinical trials as a potential treatment for functional dyspepsia.

In animal models, corydaline increases gastric emptying and small intestine transit speed and induces gastric relaxation.

In other animal models, corydaline inhibits chemically induced pain. Additionally, this compound may inhibit mast cell-dependent smooth muscle contraction of the aorta.

It inhibits thrombin-induced platelet aggregation in vitro (IC_{50} = 54.16 μg/ml).

== Biosynthesis ==
In Corydalis cava, palmatine is converted to corydaline by the enzyme corydaline synthase. The methyl group comes from S-adenosyl methionine (SAM) and the reaction also requires nicotinamide adenine dinucleotide phosphate (NADPH).

palmatine
+ SAM
+ 2 NADPH
H^{+}
corydaline
+ SAH
+ 2 NADP^{+}
