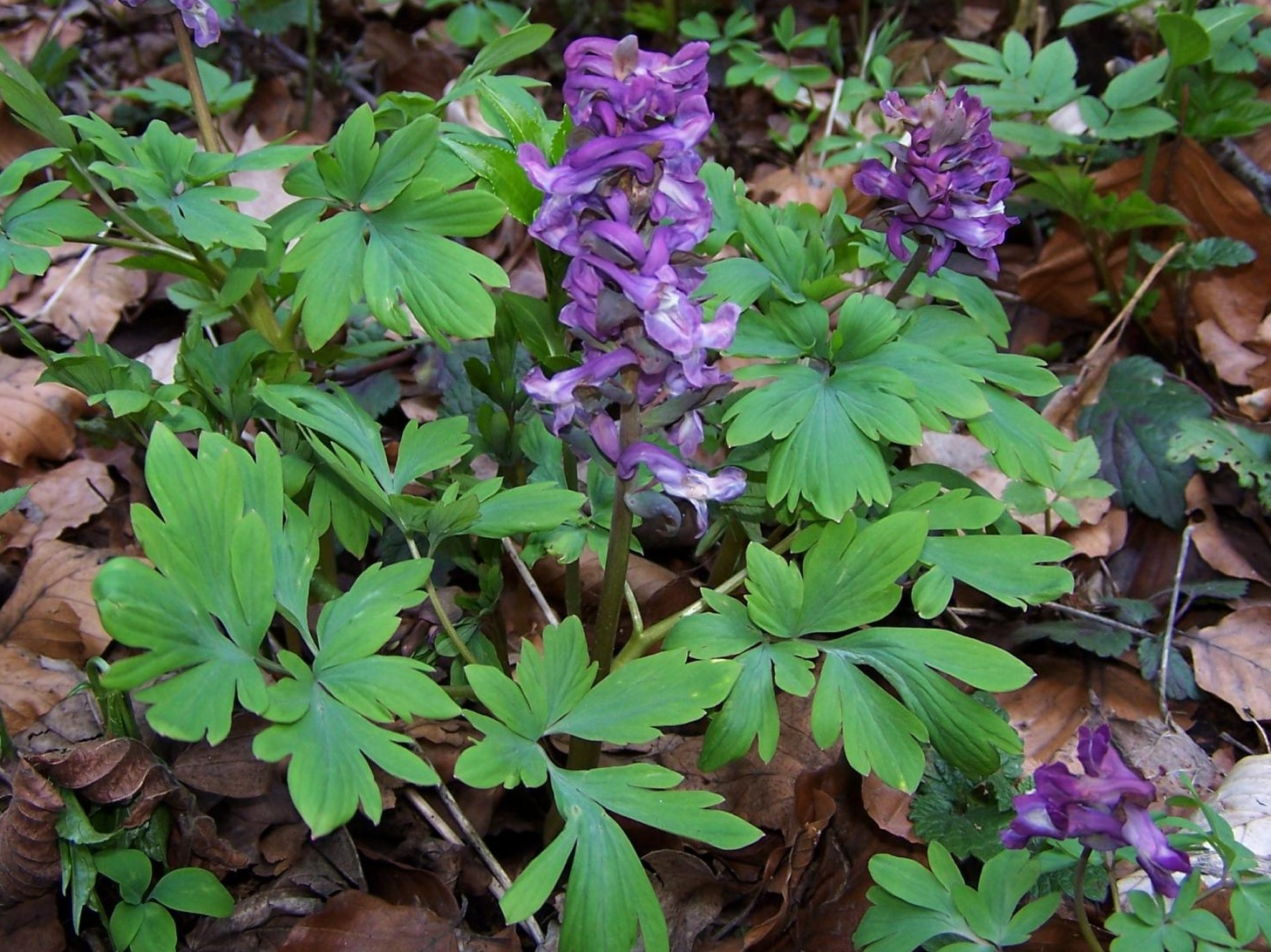

Scientific classification
- Kingdom: Plantae
- Clade: Tracheophytes
- Clade: Angiosperms
- Clade: Eudicots
- Order: Ranunculales
- Family: Papaveraceae
- Genus: Corydalis
- Species: C. cava

Binomial name
- Corydalis cava (L.) Schweigg. & Körte

= Corydalis cava =

Species of flowering plant in the poppy family

Corydalis cava is a species of flowering plant in the family Papaveraceae, native to moist, shady, woodland habitats throughout most of mainland Europe, although commonest in central and southeast Europe. Its range extends from Spain in the west to Ukraine, Belarus and the Caucasus in the east and as far north as Sweden. It is absent from (though may sometimes be found in a naturalised state in) Iceland, the UK, the Netherlands, Norway, Finland, Russia and Greece.

== Description ==
Corydalis cava grows 15 cm (6 in) to 30 cm (12 in) tall. It is a spring ephemeral—foliage that grows in the spring dies down to its tuberous rootstock in summer. It has long-spurred flowers which appear in spring. The flowers may be mauve, purple, red, or white.

The seeds contain an elaiosome that attracts ants, which transport the seeds into their ant colony. This seed transportation is called myrmecochory.

== Toxicity ==
Structure of the Isoquinoline alkaloid bulbocapnine

Structure of the isoquinoline alkaloid canadine

Many of the species in Corydalis contain alkaloids such as canadine and corydaline, which blocks calcium. The majority of these belong to the isoquinoline alkaloid group. All parts of the plant are alkaloidal but the highest concentrations are present in the hollow root tuber.

Corydalis cava and some other tuberous species contain the alkaloid bulbocapnine, which is occasionally used in medicine but for which scientific evidence is lacking in regard to correct dosage and side effects.

== Gallery ==
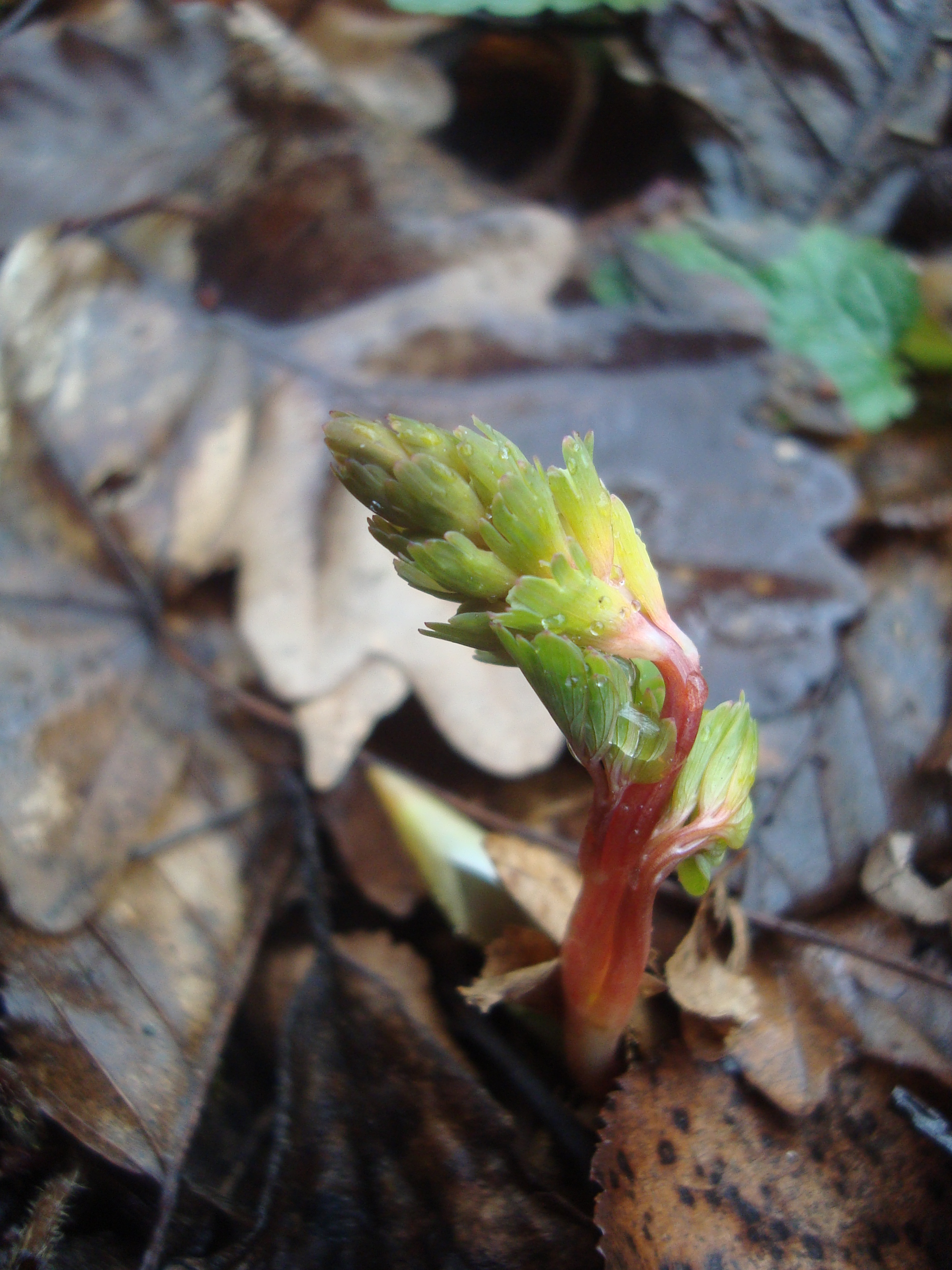
Young shoot pushing up through leaf litter. Přírodní park, Podkomorské forest, South Moravia, Czech Republic

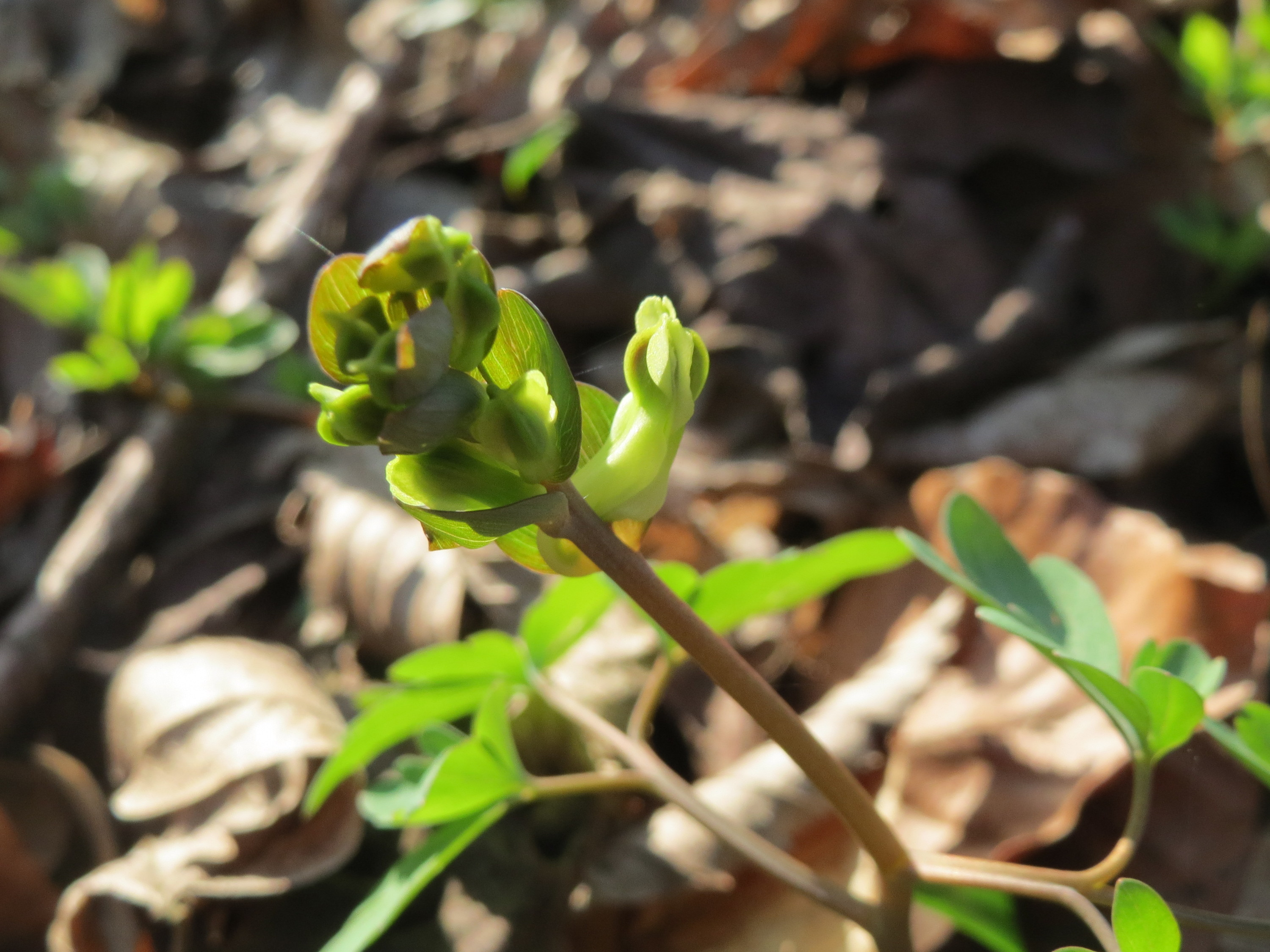
Developing inflorescence. Lower Lußhart near Neulußheim, Baden-Württemberg, Germany

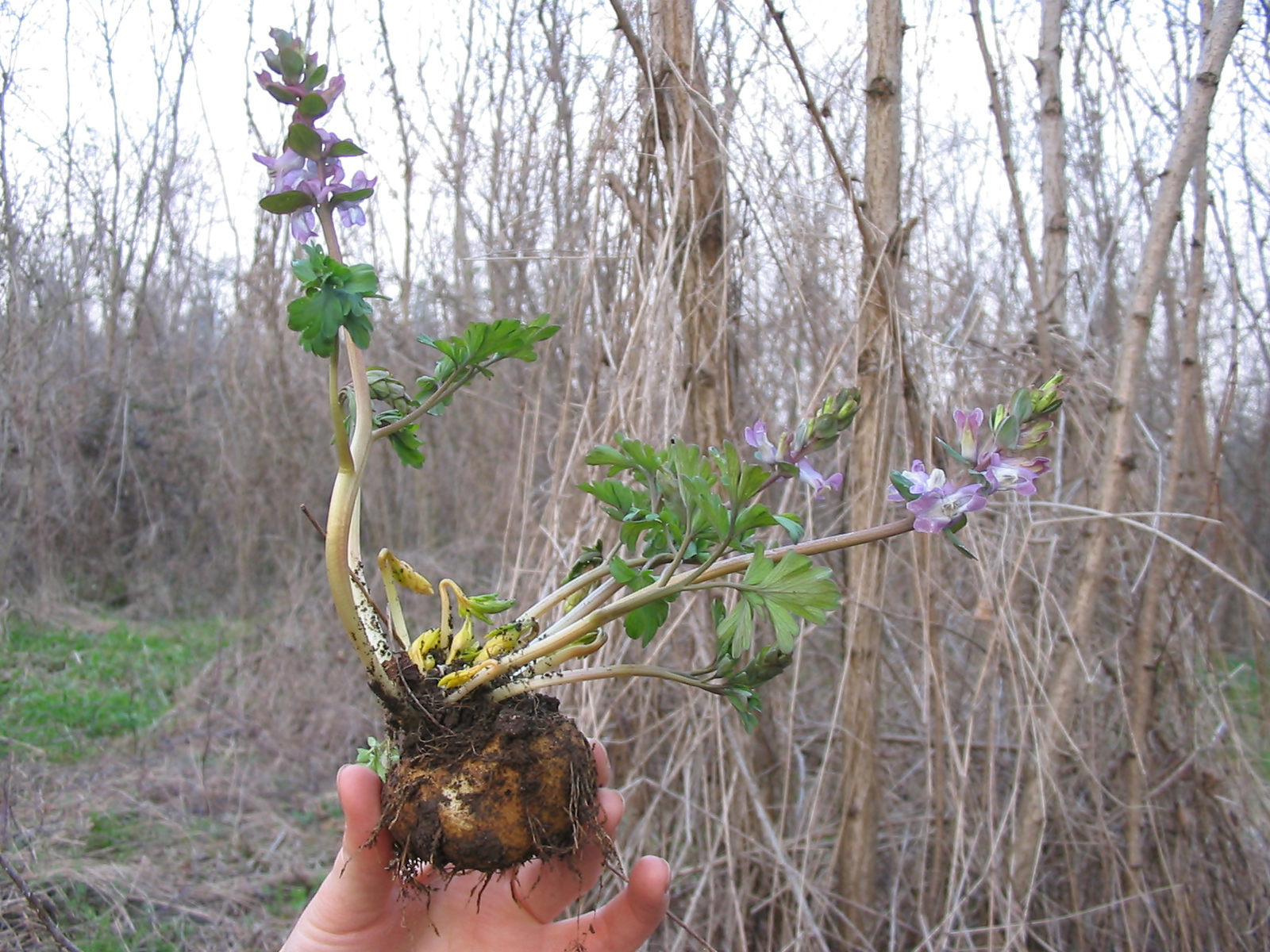
Mature specimen from a wood in Vicenza (Veneto, Italy) uprooted at flowering time to show large, hollow tuber

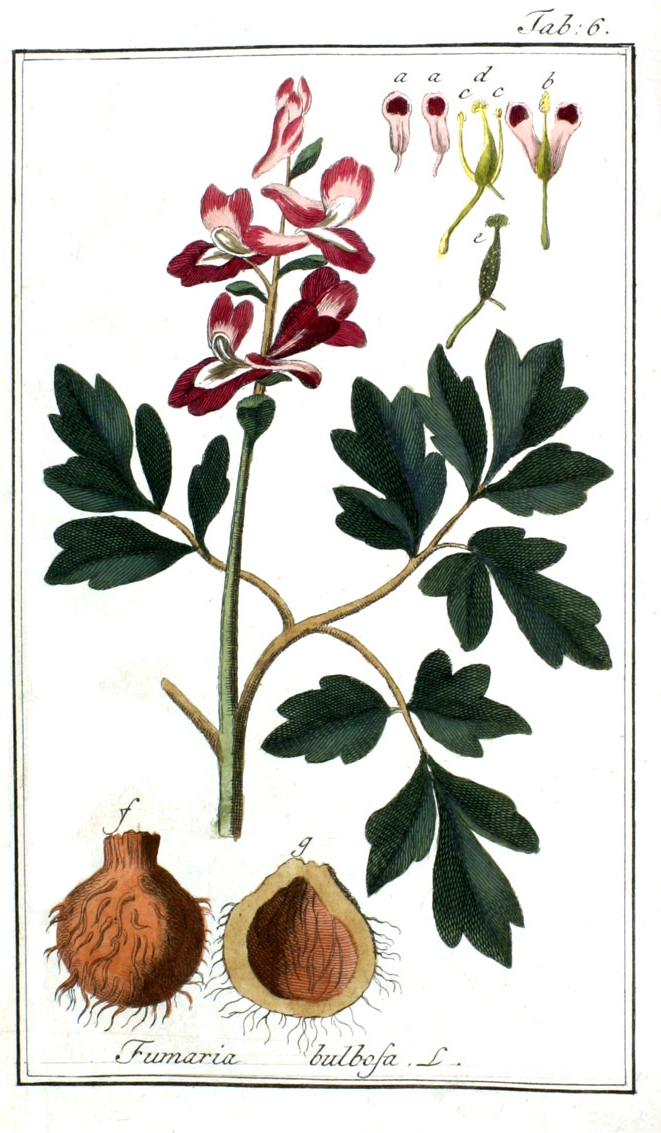
Dutch coloured plate showing anatomical detail (under original Linnaean name Fumaria bulbosa i.e. "bulbous fumitory")

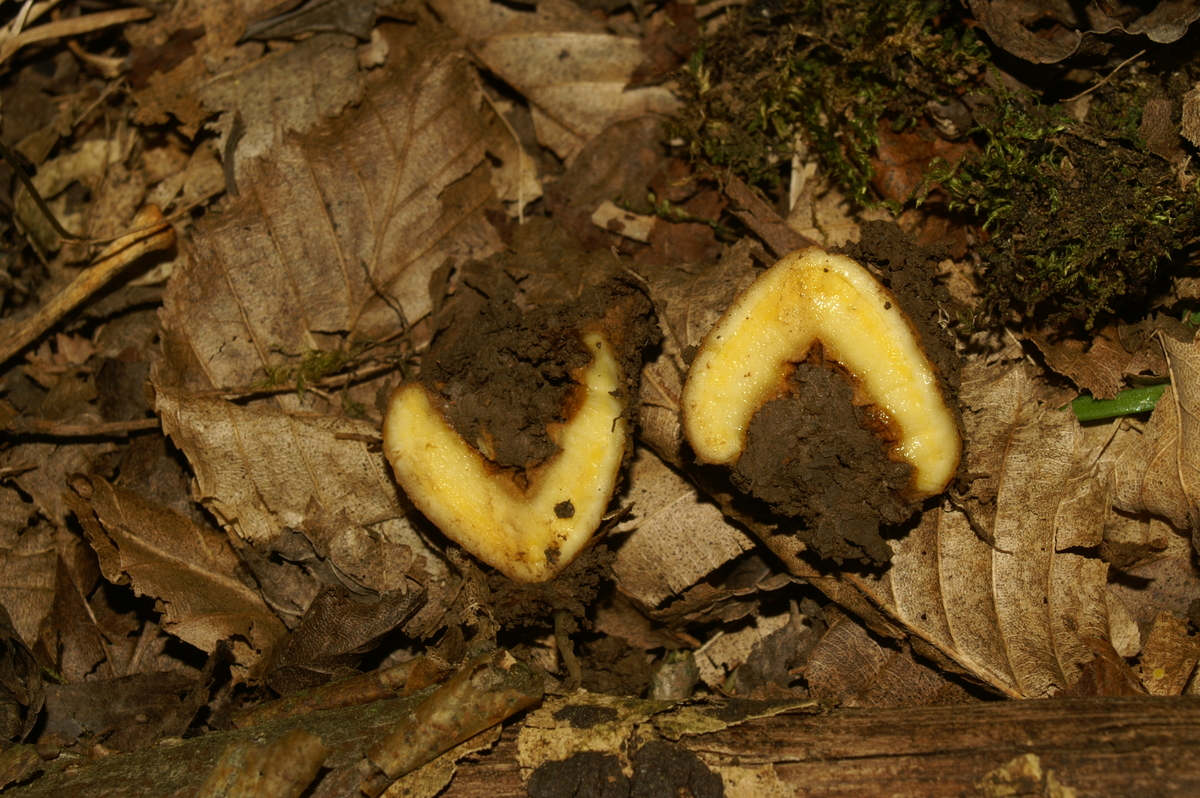
Hollow tuber bisected to show central void. Forest floor, Rak Škocjan Landscape park, Slovenia.

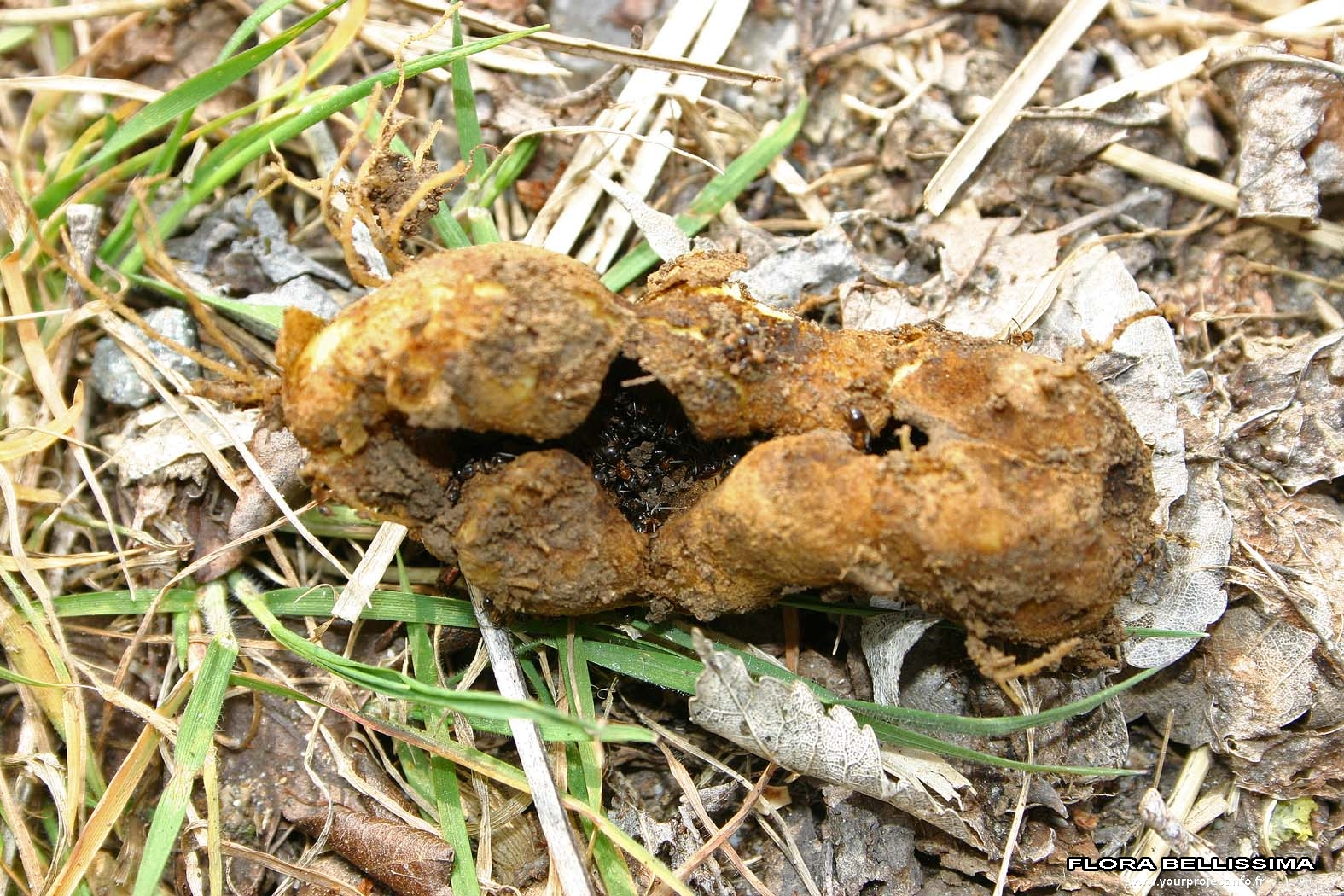
Ants gathered in the void in an exposed tuber, seemingly as attracted by odour of tuber as by that of seed elaiosome

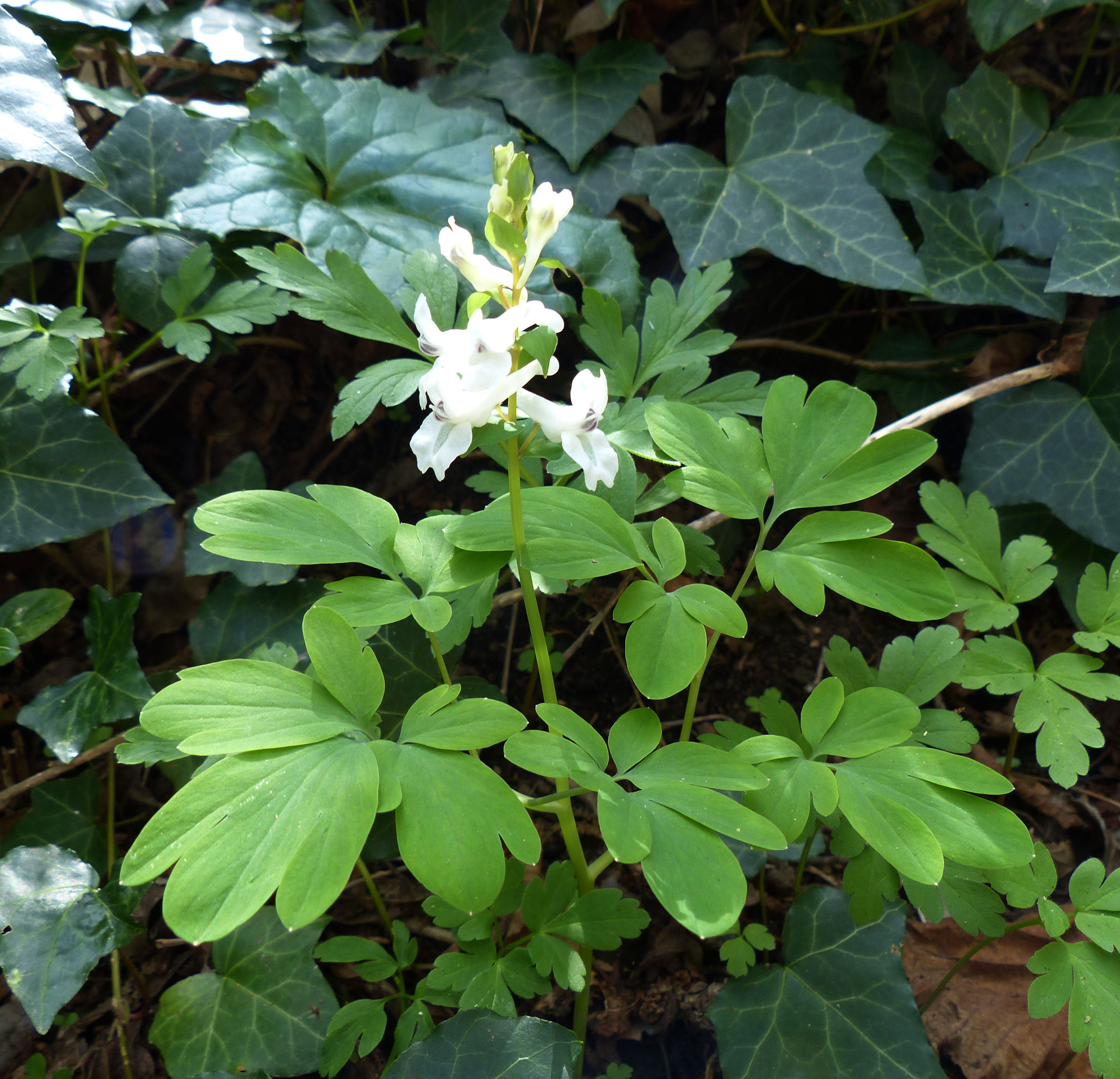
Specimen of white-flowered form blooming among ivy leaves

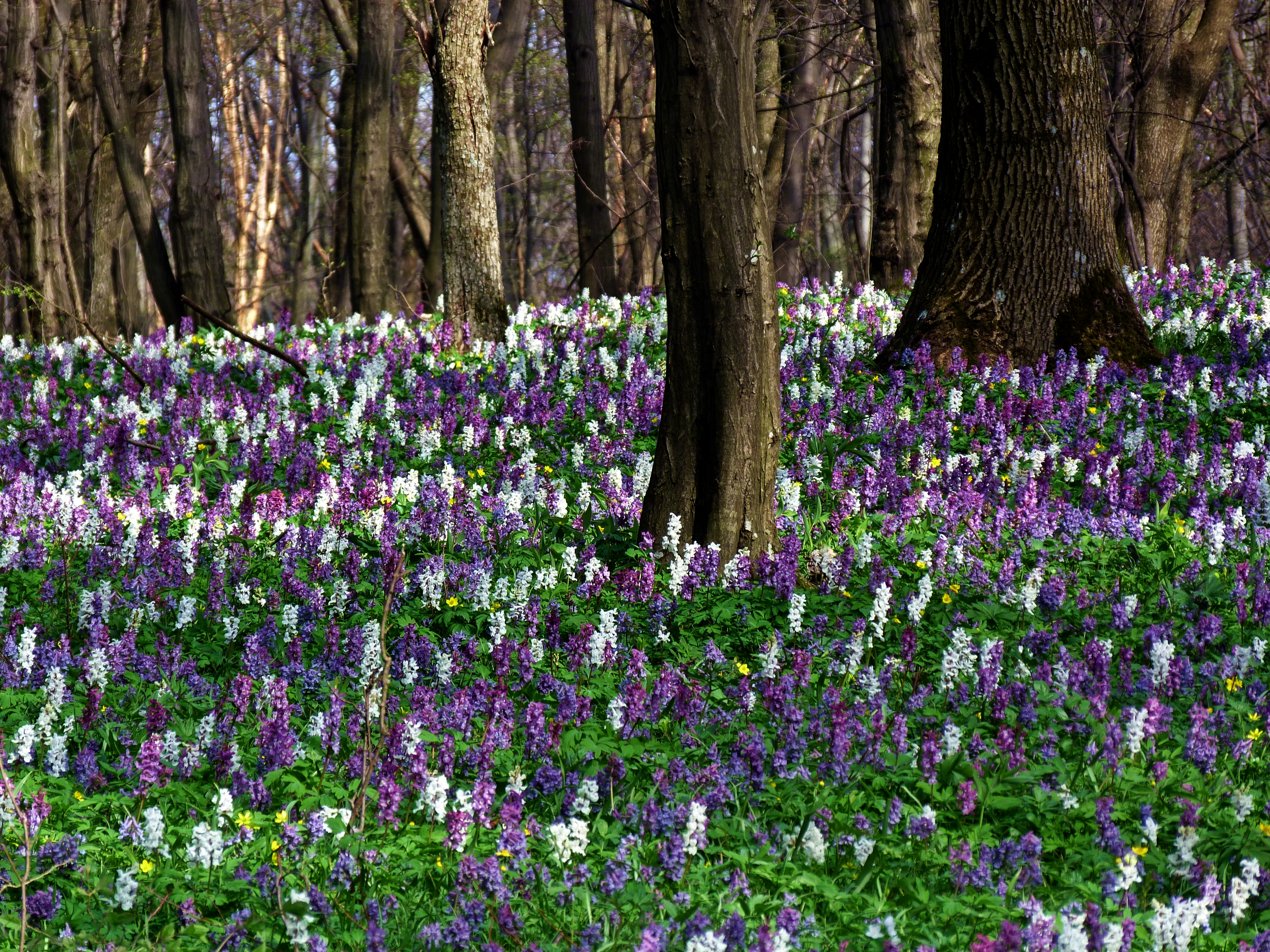
Dense carpet of flowering plants (both pink and white-flowered forms) on forest floor

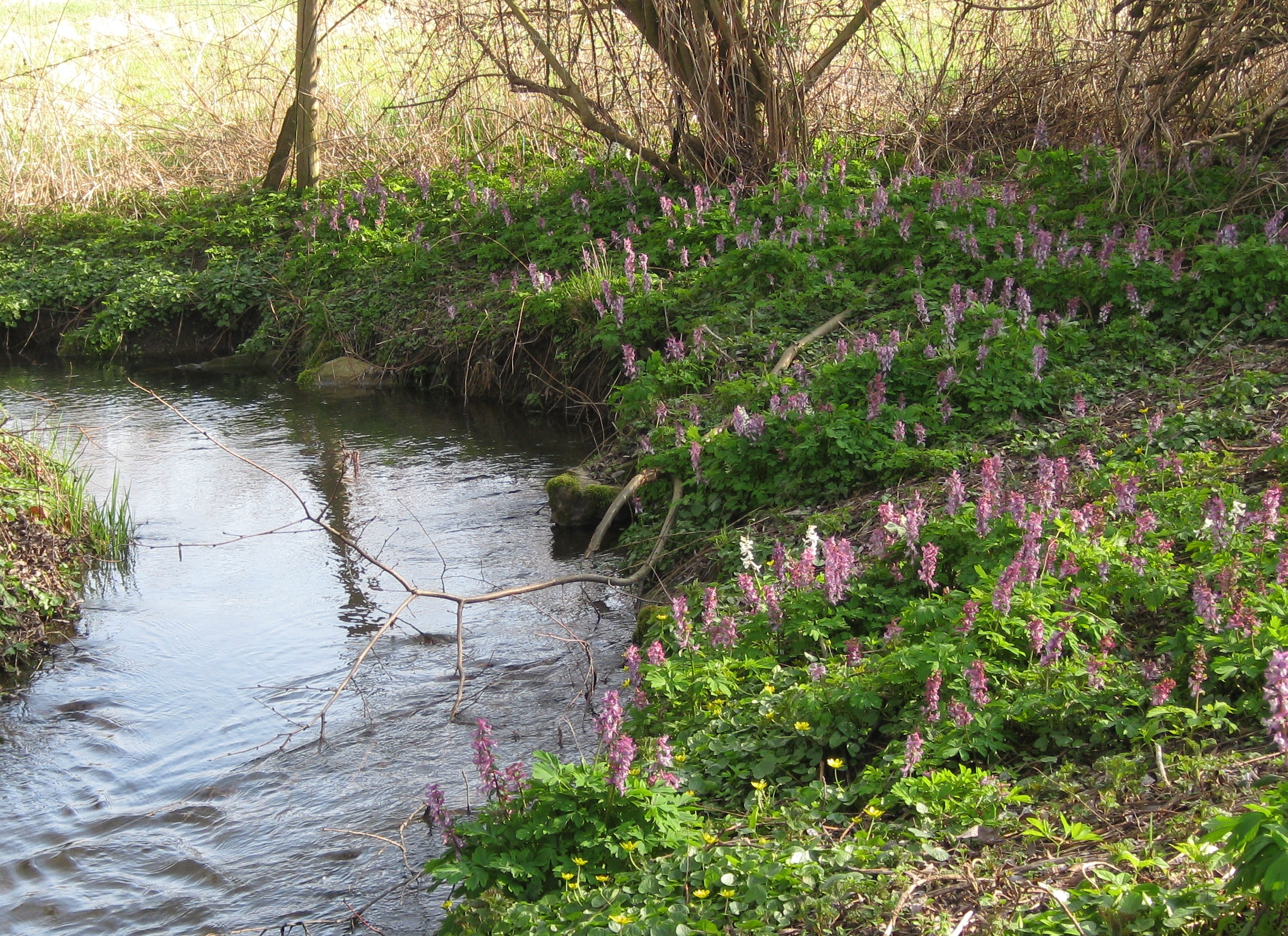
Flowering plants thriving in damp conditions on a stream bank

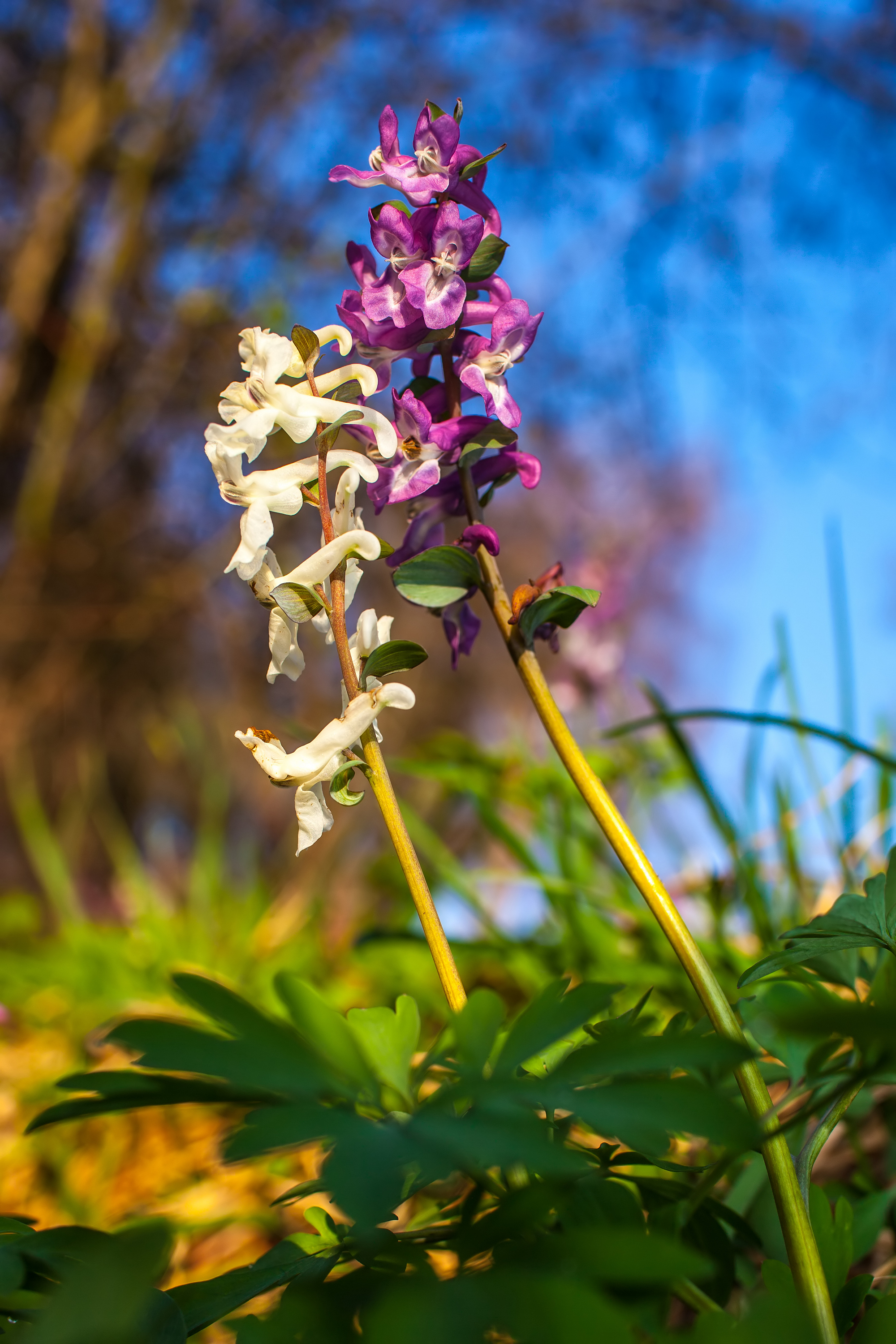
Comparison of inflorescences of pink-flowered and white-flowered forms. Rosenfeld, Baden-Württemberg, southern Germany.

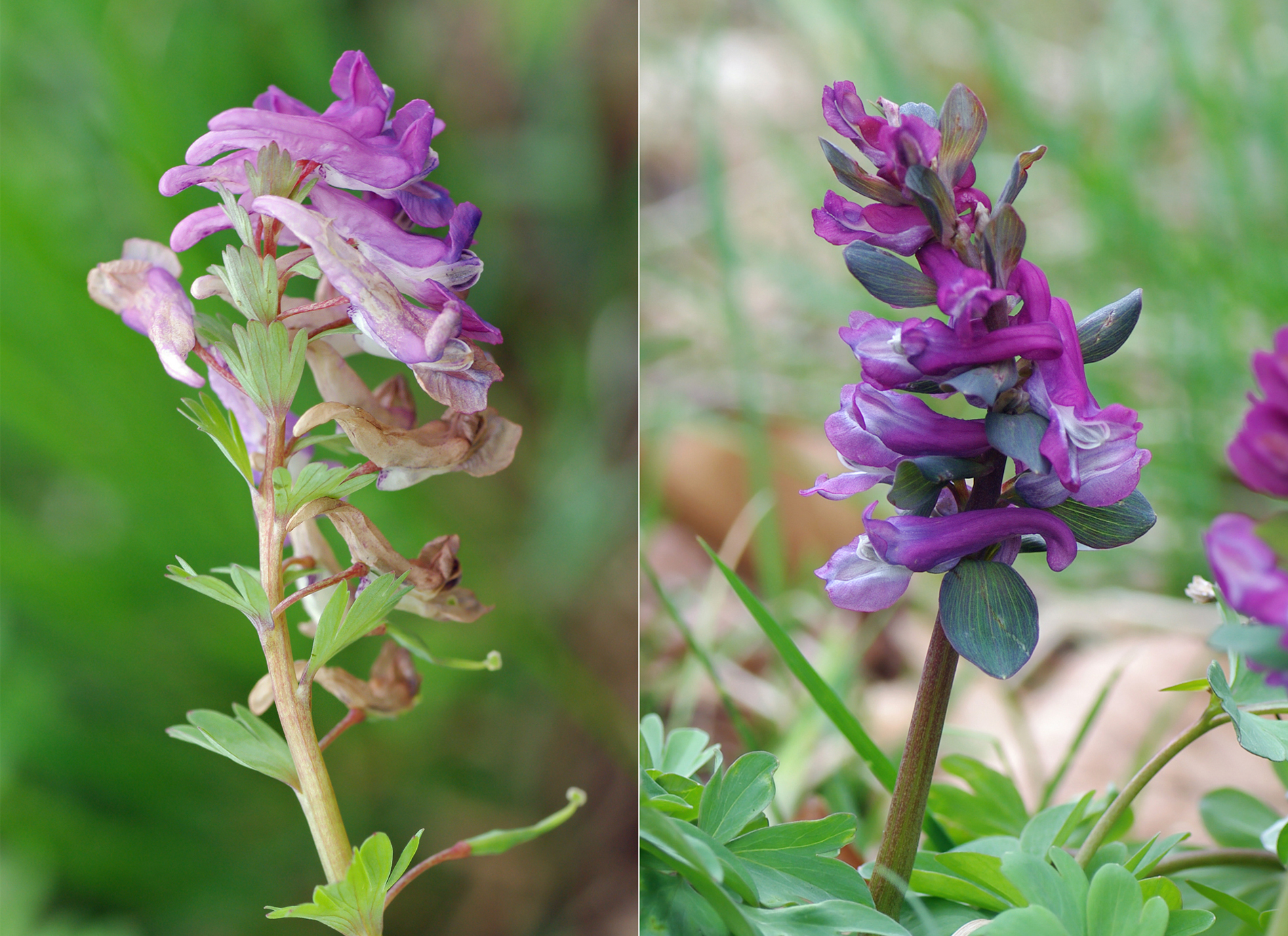
Comparison of inflorescences of Corydalis cava (right, with simple bracts) and the closely related C. solida (left, with digitate bracts)

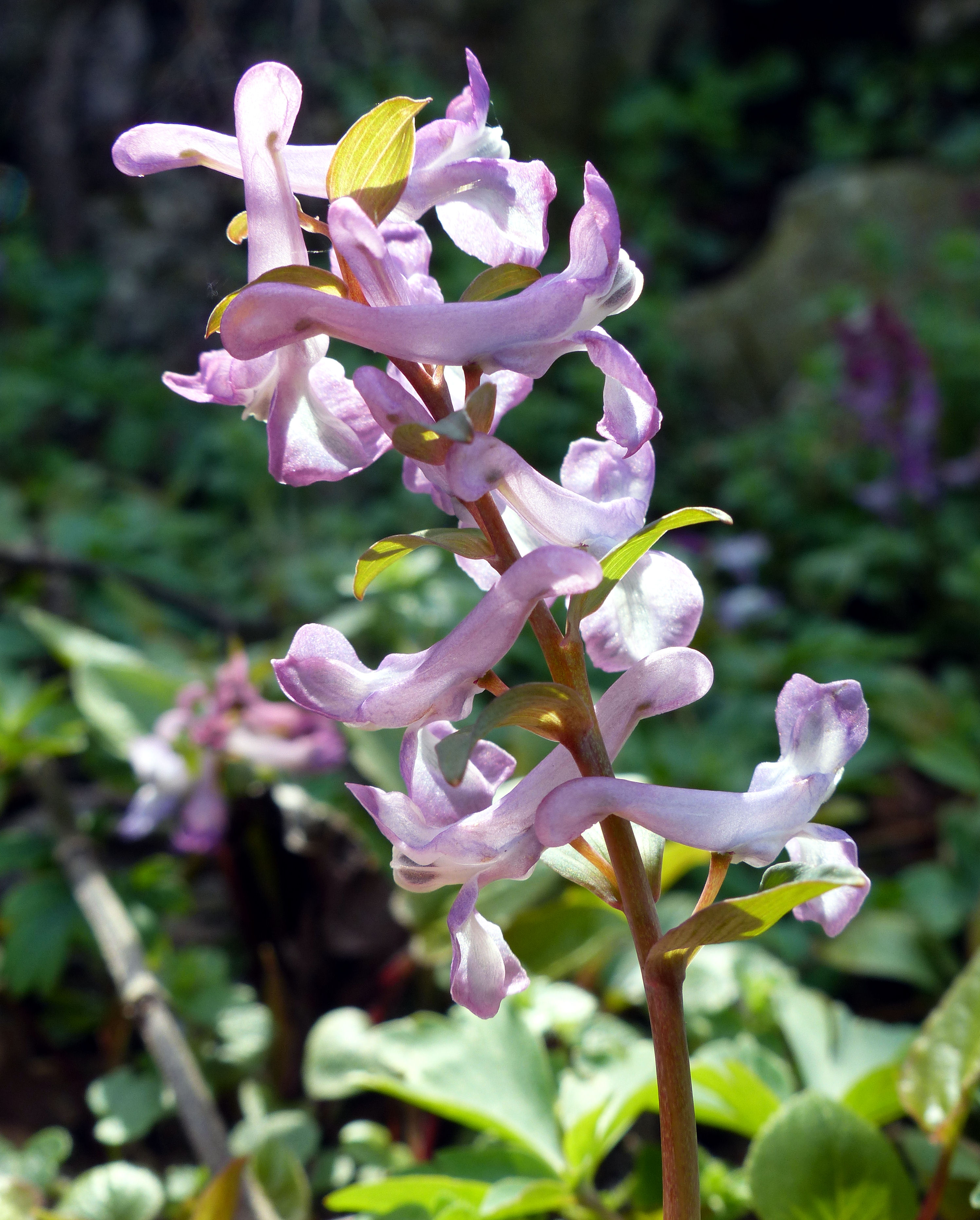
Inflorescence of pink-flowered form, back-lit by bright sunlight, silhouetting structures within flower spurs

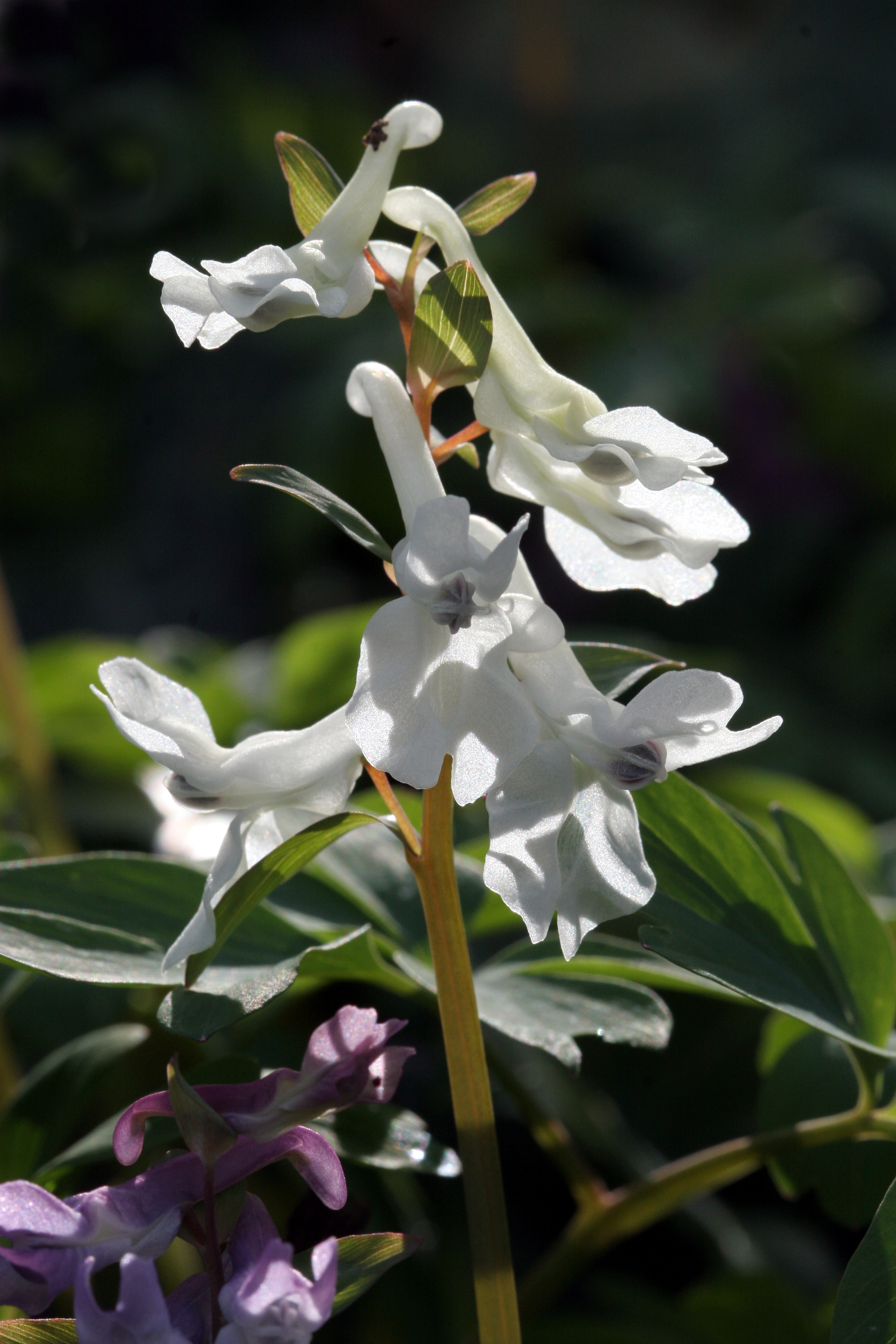
Inflorescence of white-flowered form, back-lit by bright sunlight

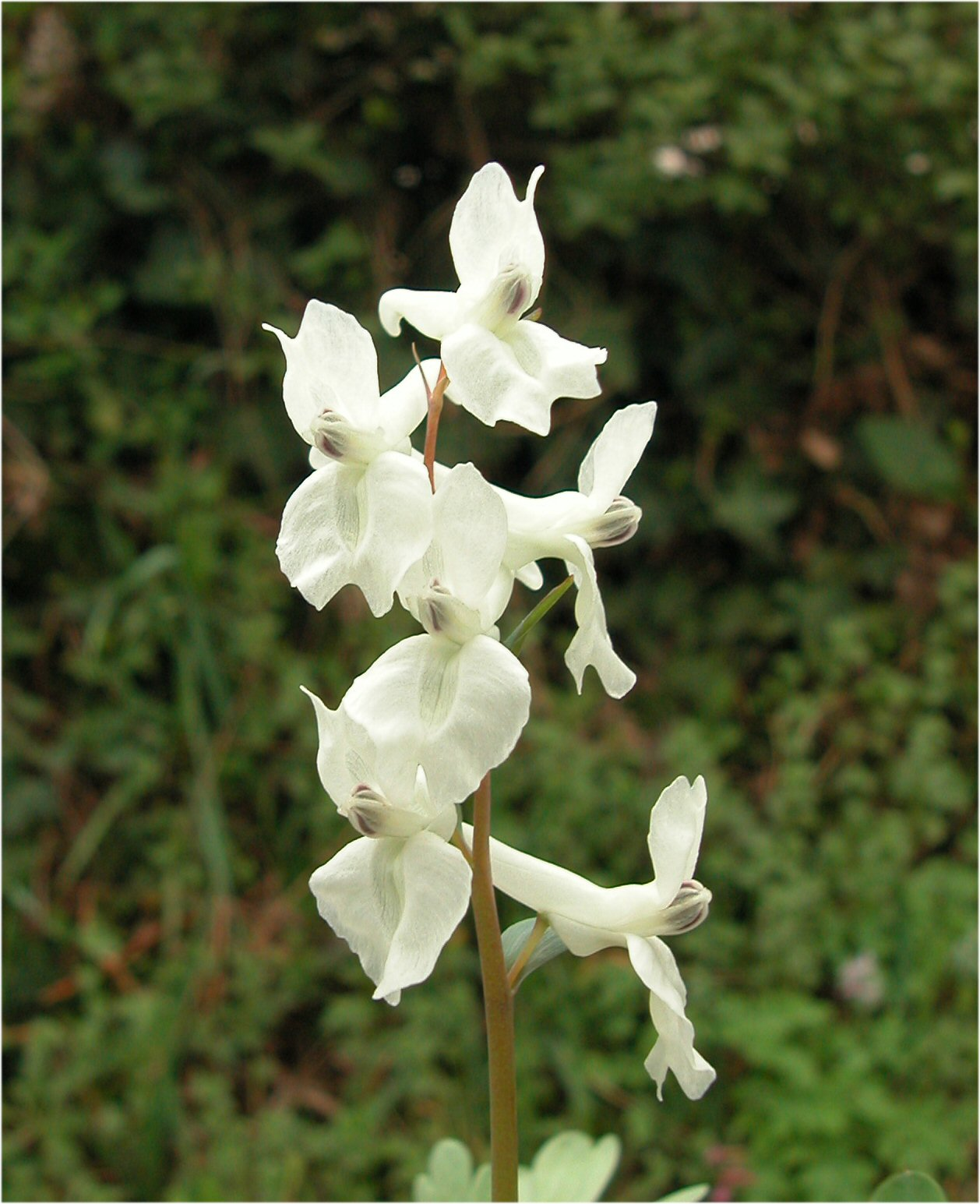
Front-lit inflorescence of white-flowered form

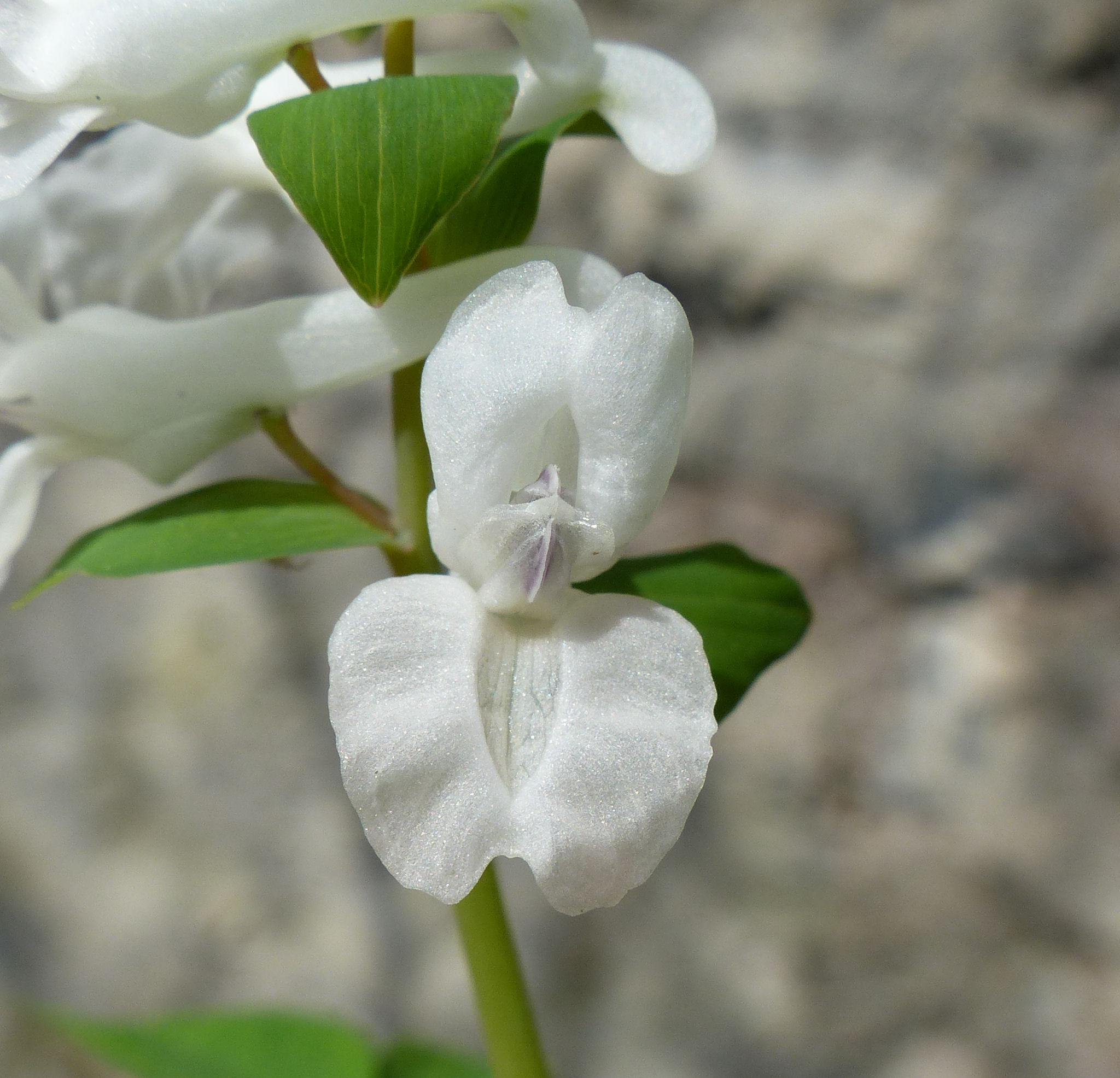
Front view of individual flower of white-flowered form

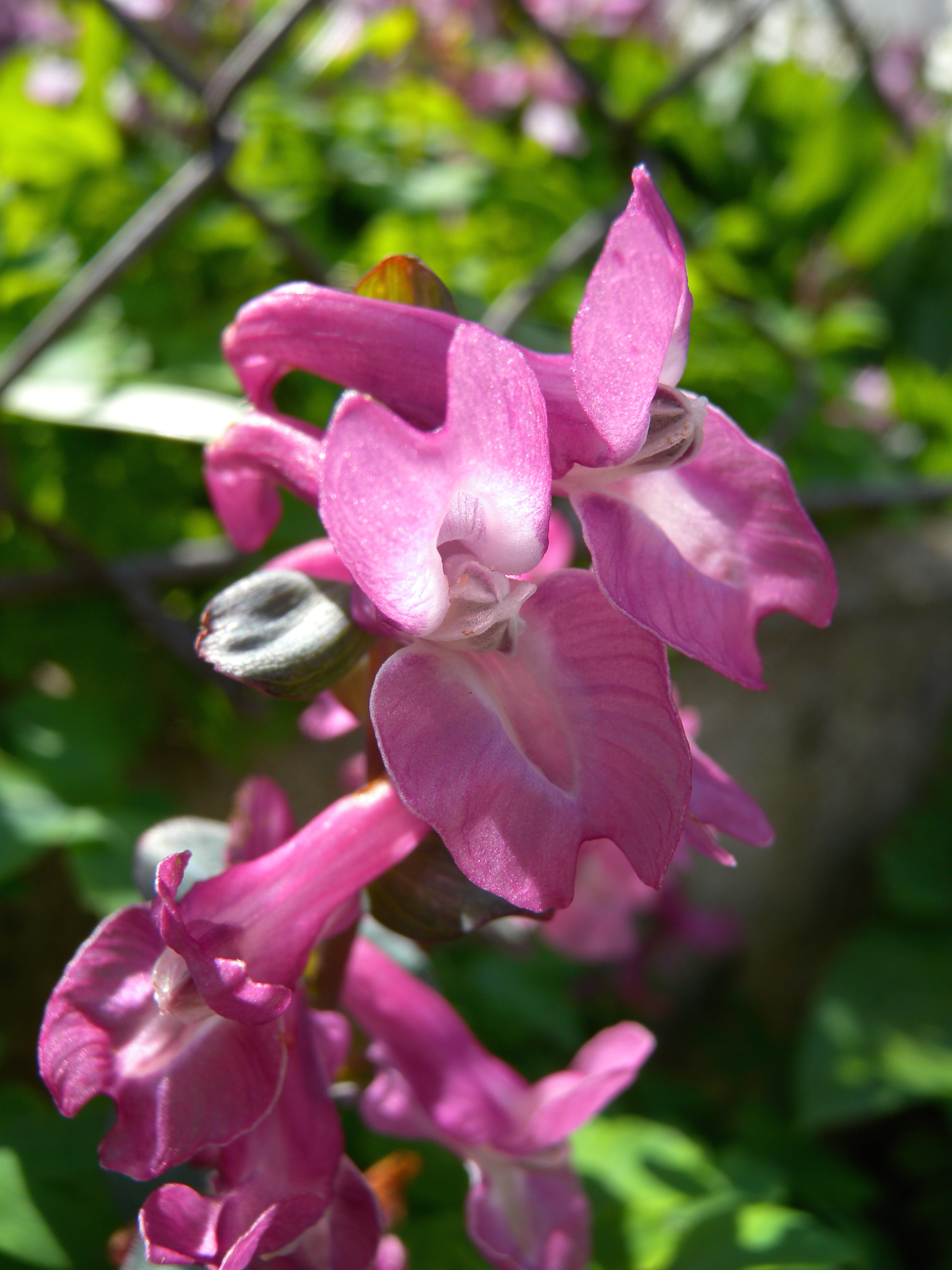
Front view of individual flowers of wild plant, Alte aare nr. Aarberg, Switzerland

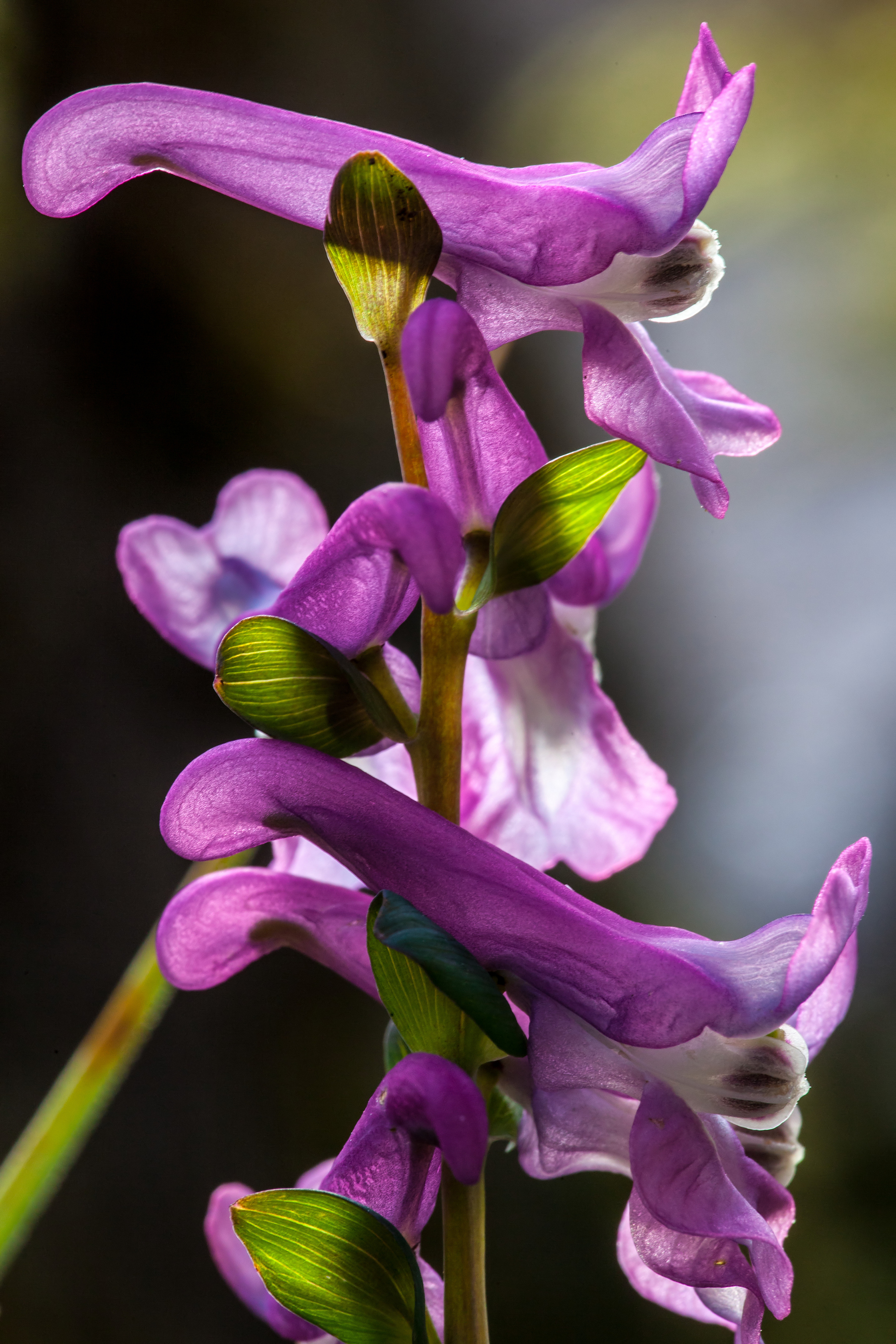
Back-lit inflorescence, showing clearly striated venation of bracts

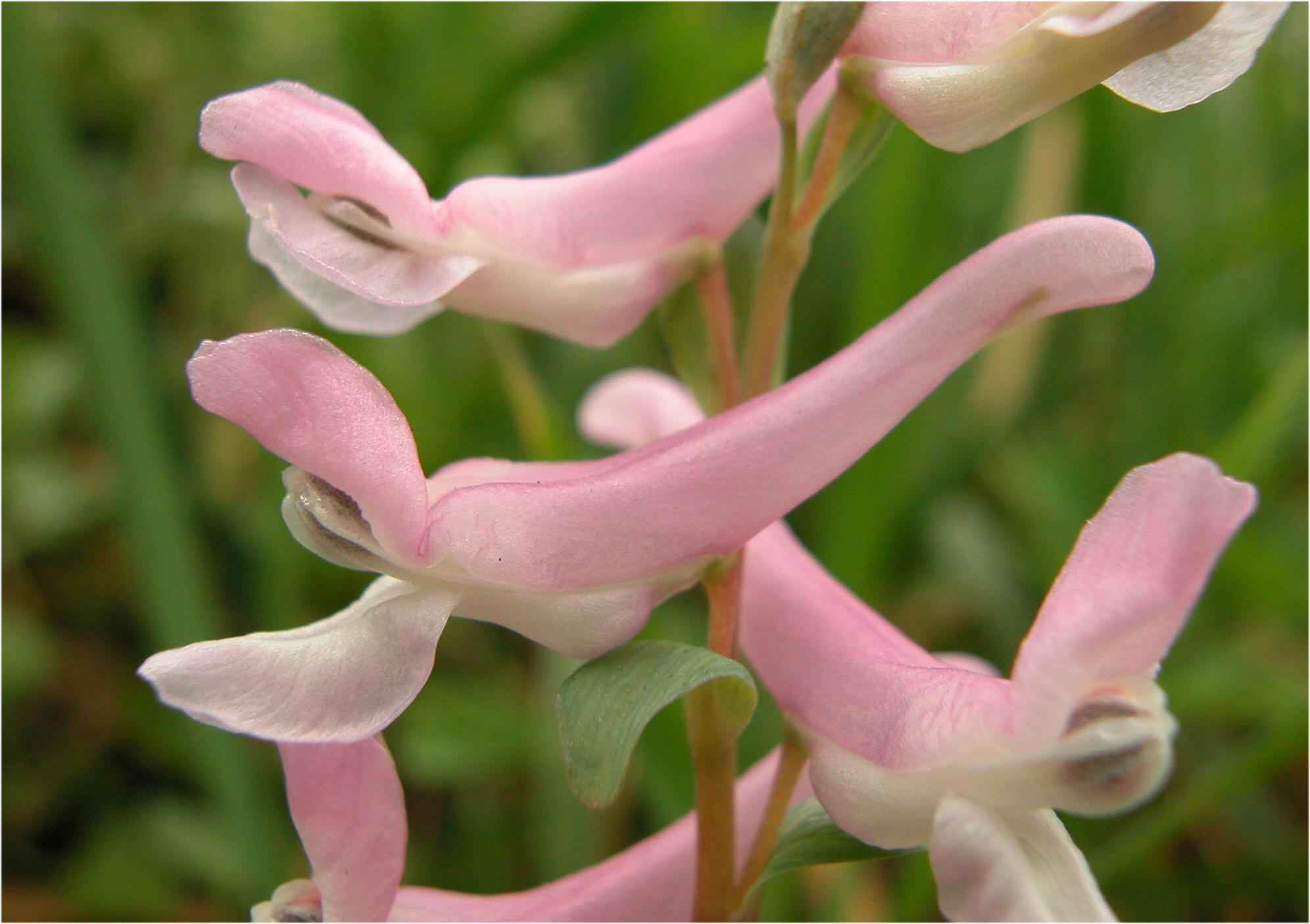
Close-up of flowers of pale pink form in profile

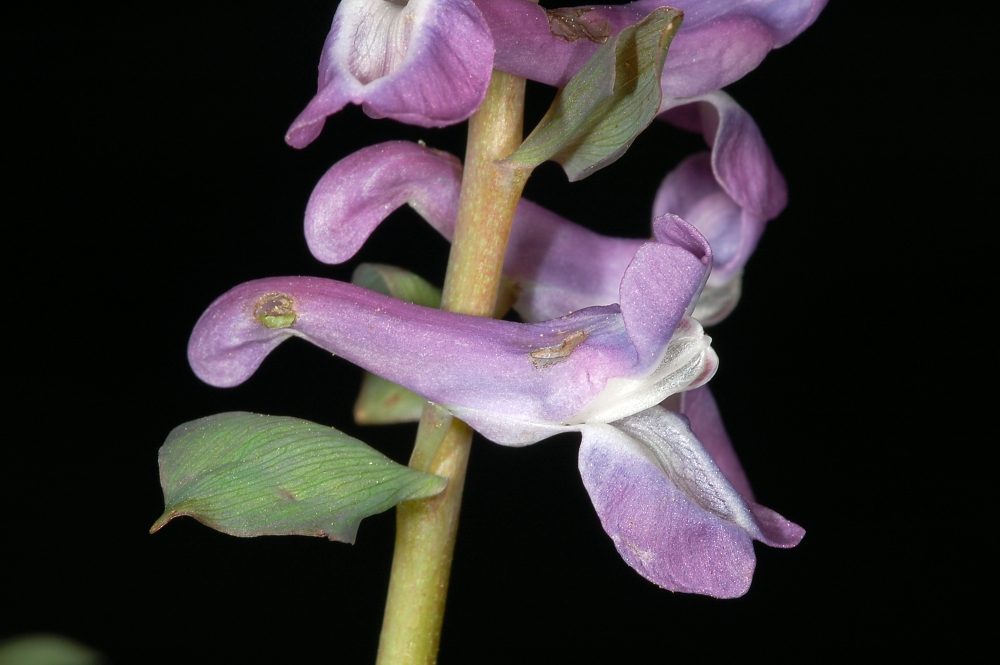
Side view of flower showing hole chewed in nectary by nectar-stealing insect. Selzerbrunnen, Frankfurt, Germany.

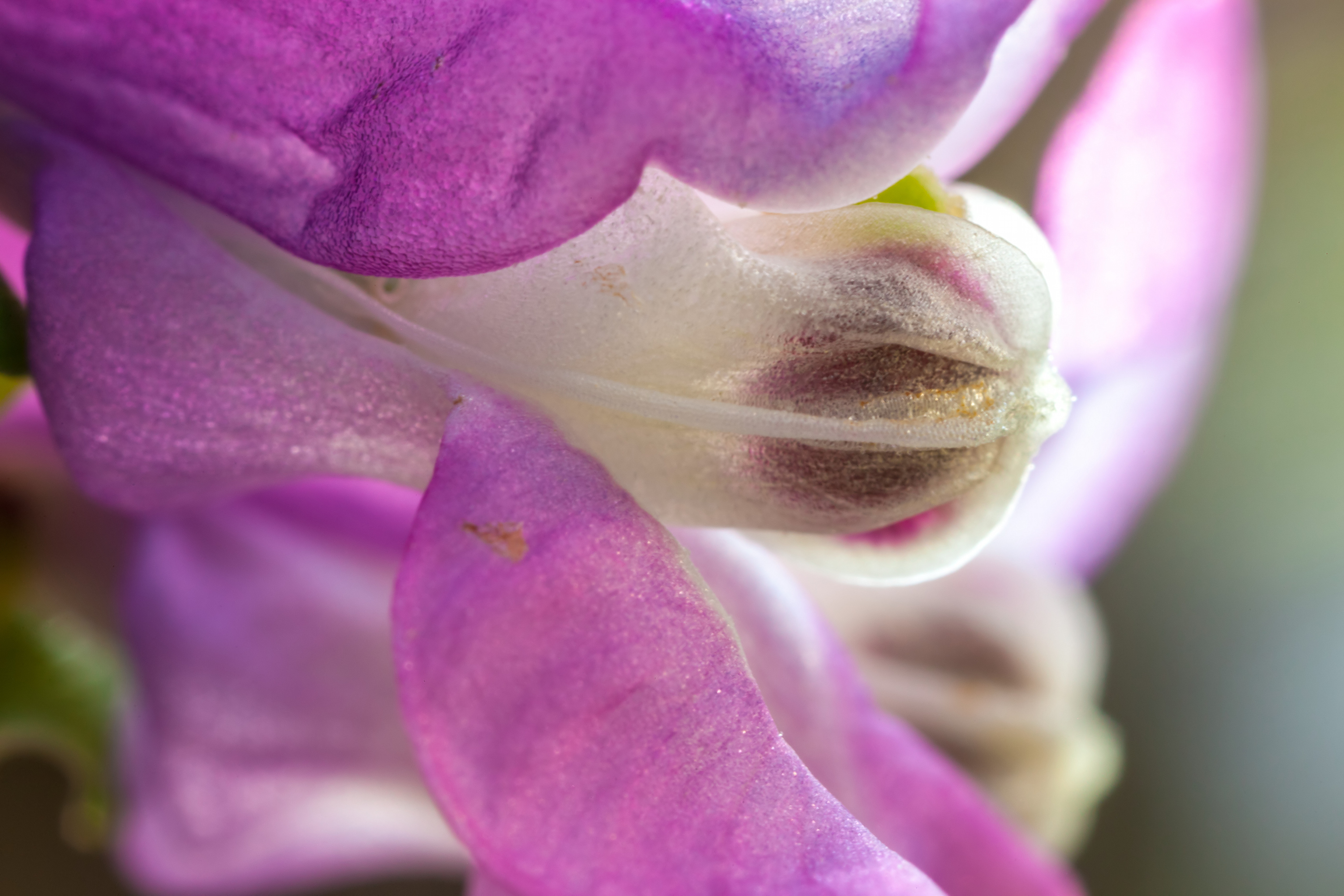
Central structure of interior of single flower. Rosenfeld, Baden-Württemberg southern Germany.

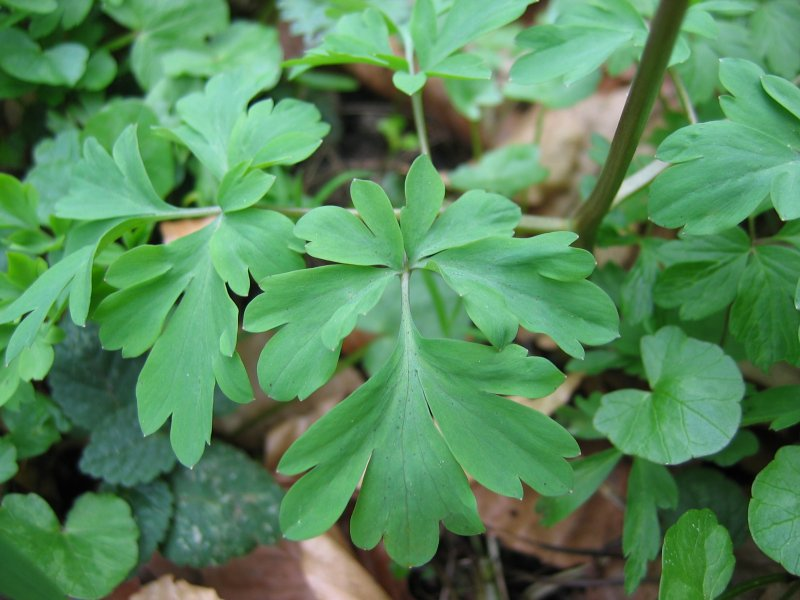
Leaves of specimen growing at Pölchow nr. Rostock, Mecklenburg-Vorpommern, Germany

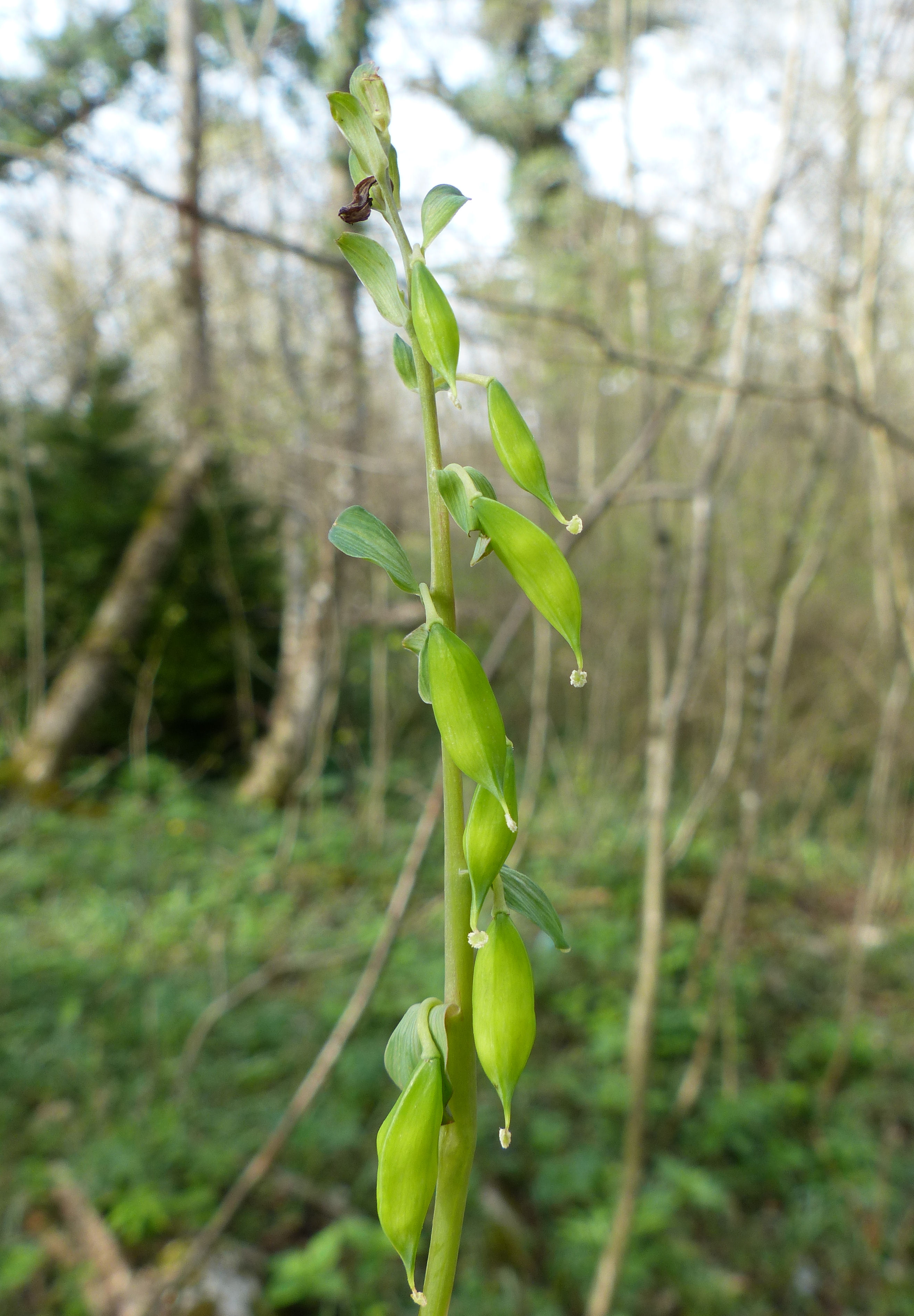
Infructescence

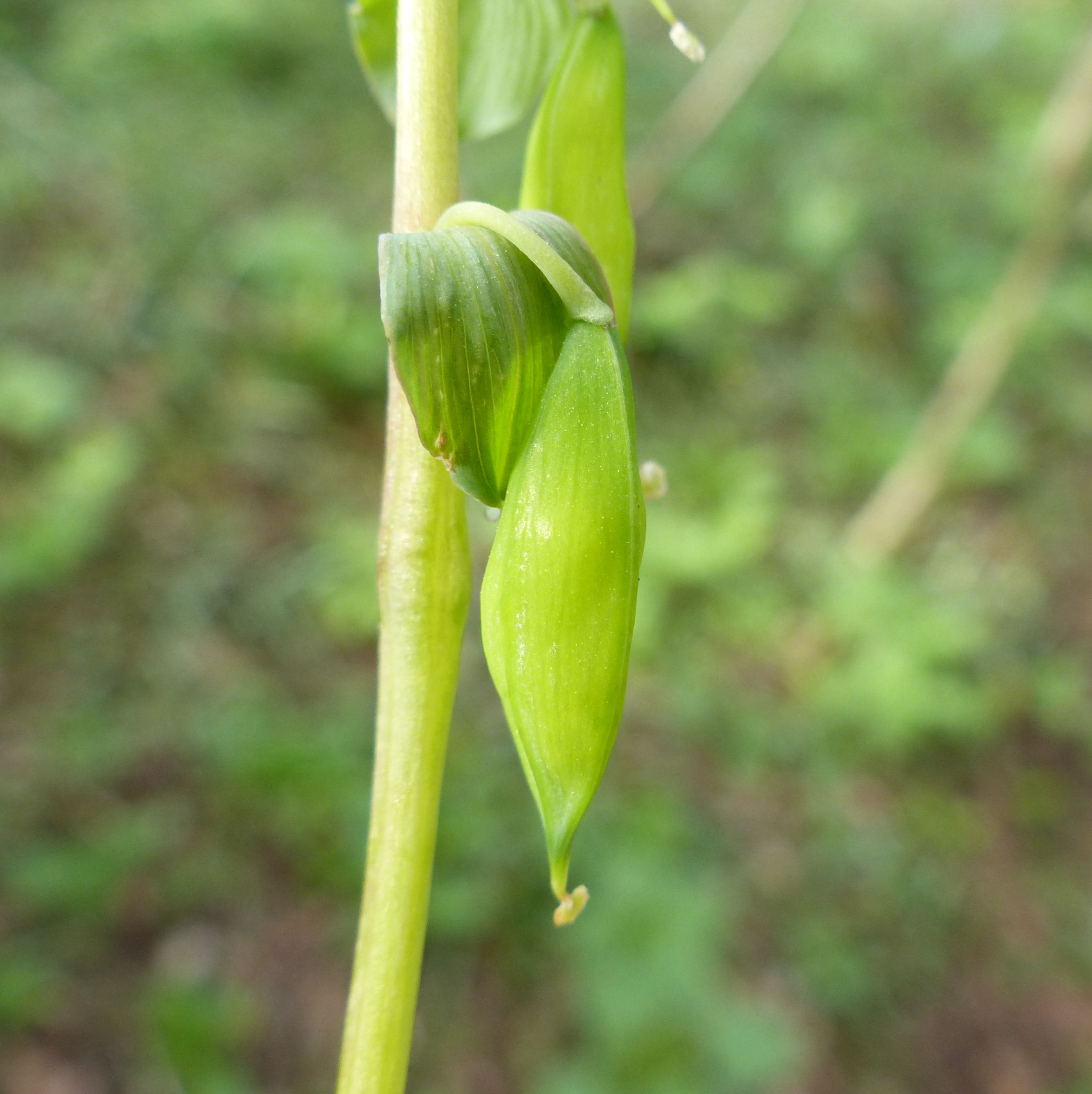
Close-up of single pendent fruit with its accompanying bract

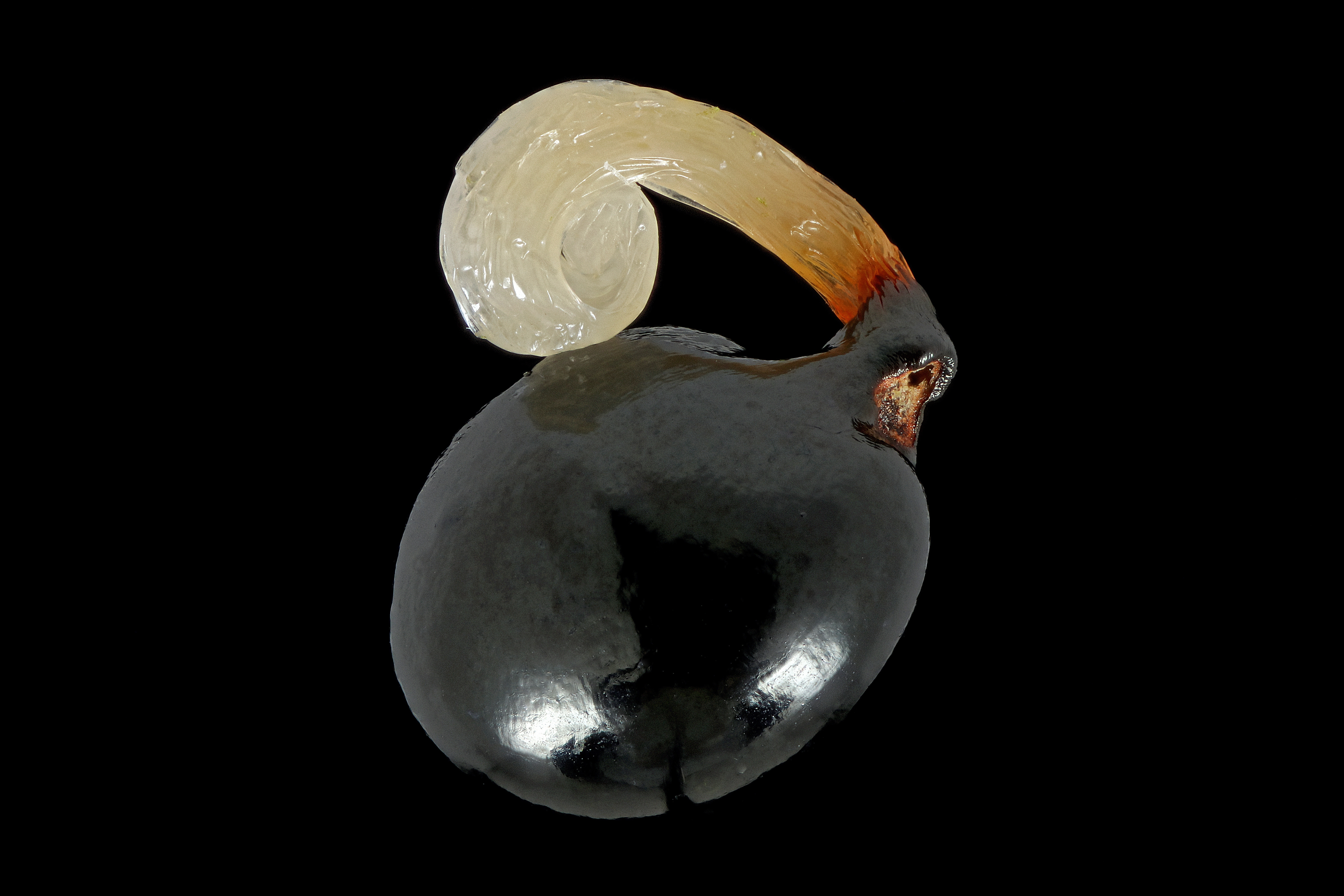
Single seed, greatly magnified, showing its elaiosome (= oily, ant-attracting appendage)

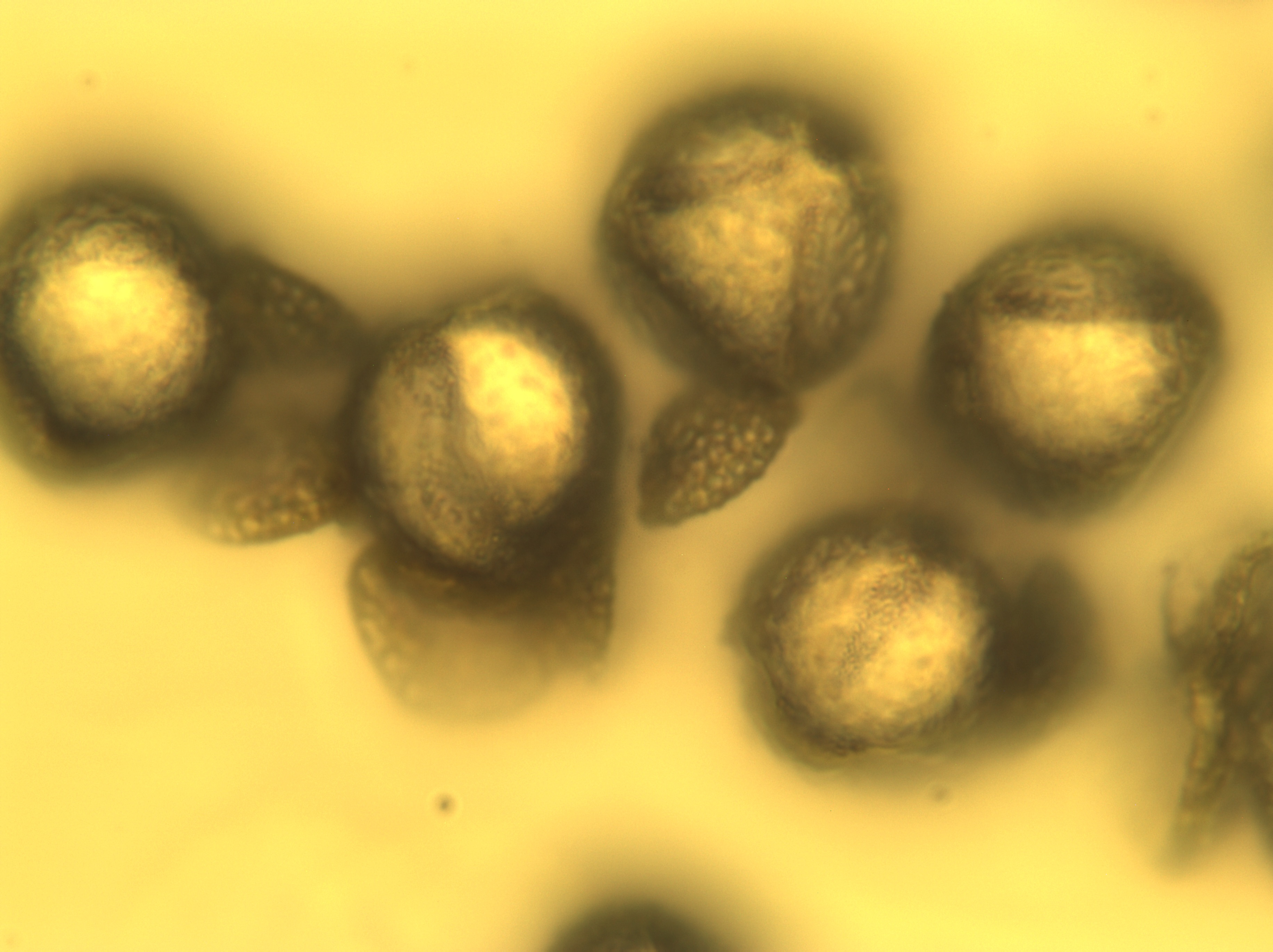
Photomicrograph of pollen grains
