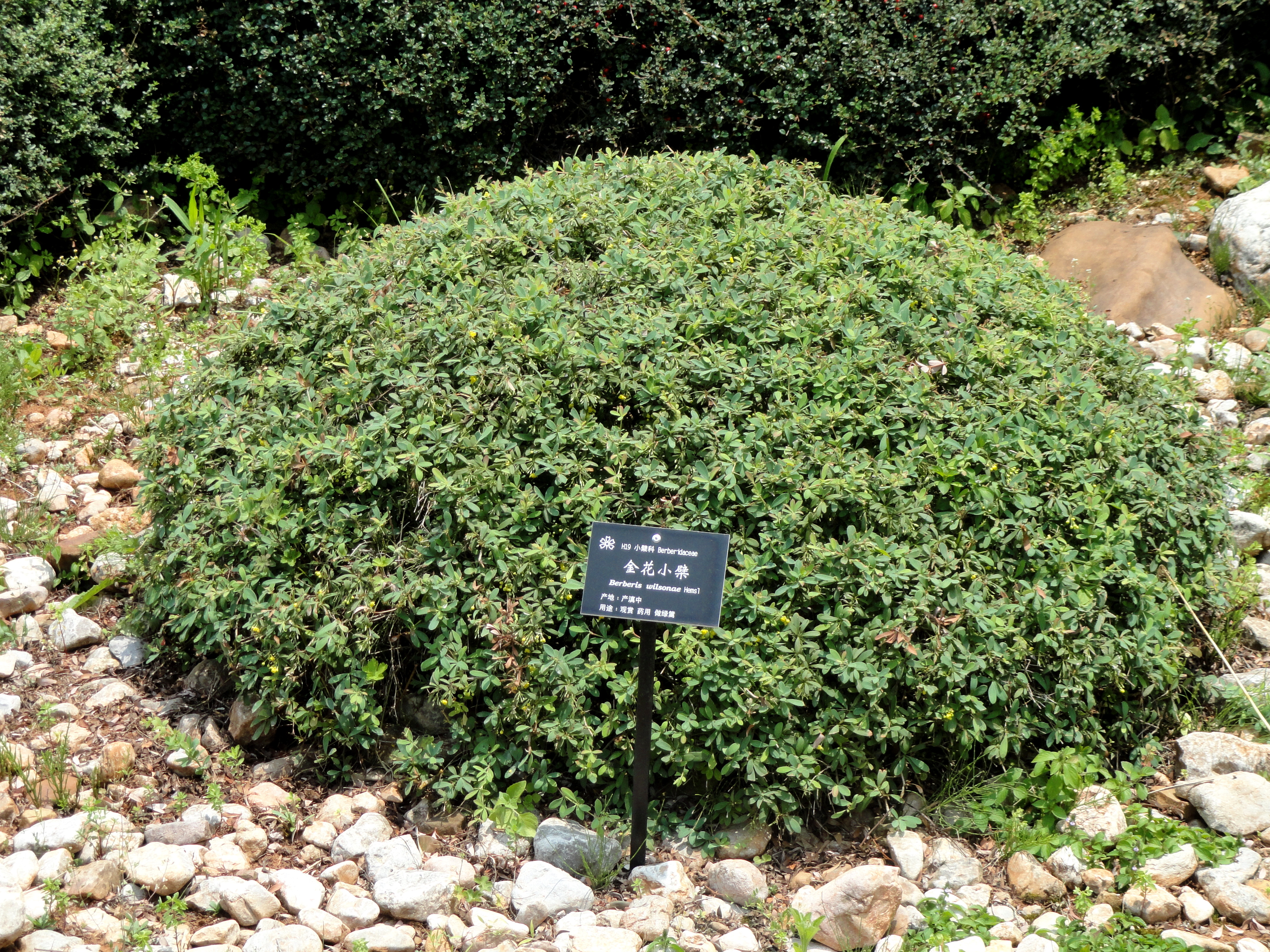
- Growth form
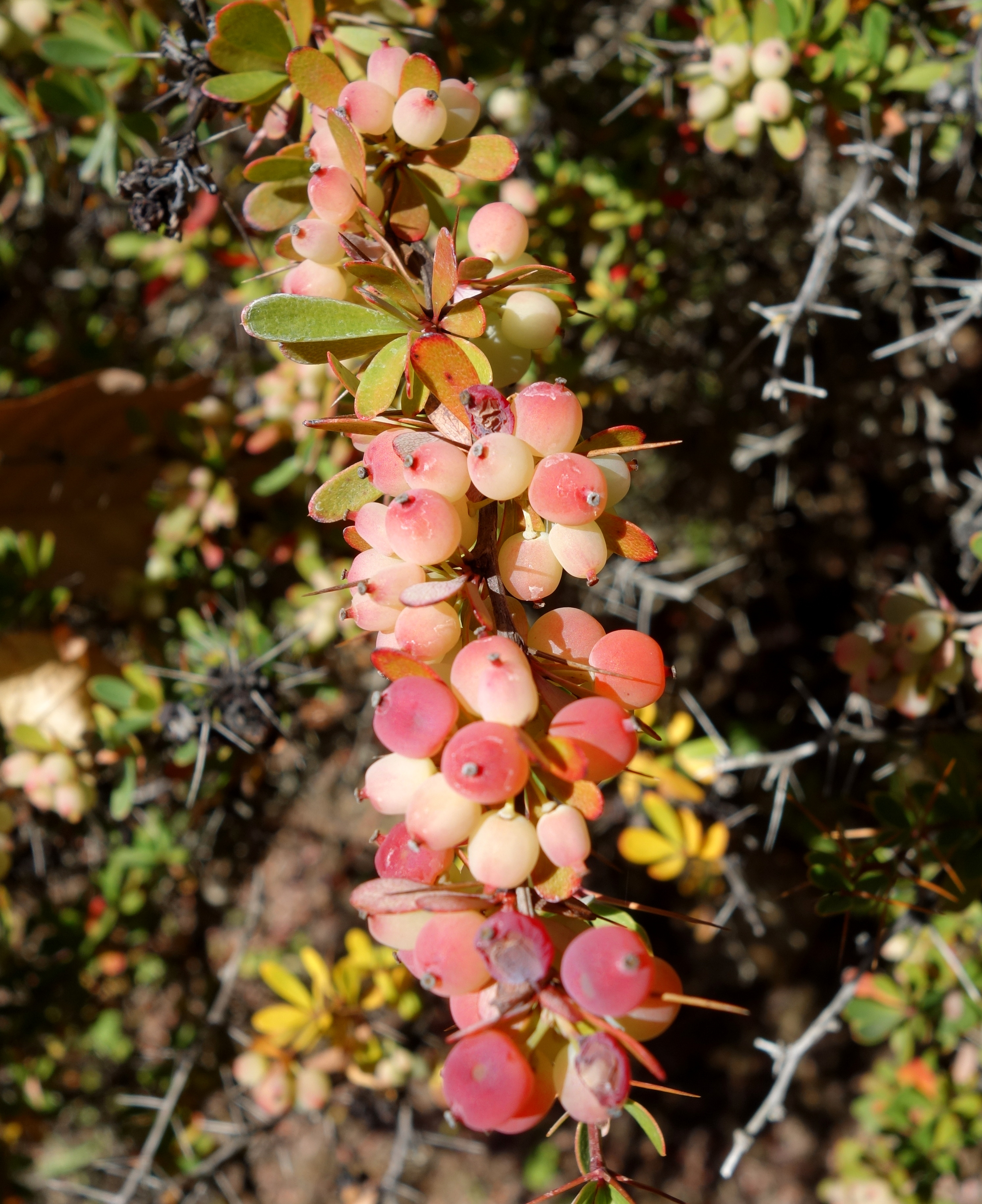
- Fruit

Scientific classification
- Kingdom: Plantae
- Clade: Embryophytes
- Clade: Tracheophytes
- Clade: Spermatophytes
- Clade: Angiosperms
- Clade: Eudicots
- Order: Ranunculales
- Family: Berberidaceae
- Genus: Berberis
- Species: B. wilsoniae

Binomial name
- Berberis wilsoniae Hemsl.

Synonyms
- List: Berberis bodinieri H.Lév.; Berberis coryi H.J.Veitch; Berberis favosa W.W.Sm.; Berberis heteropsis Ahrendt; Berberis parvifolia Sprague; Berberis stapfiana C.K.Schneid.; Berberis subcaulialata C.K.Schneid.

= Berberis wilsoniae =

Species of flowering plant

Berberis wilsoniae, Mrs. Wilson's barberry, is a species of flowering plant in the family Berberidaceae. It is native to Tibet, south-central China, and Myanmar, and has been introduced to the North and South Islands of New Zealand. It is a mound-forming, deer-resistant shrub, with blueish-green leaves that turn red in Autumn and yellow flowers that produce translucent pink fruit. A number of cultivars are available.
