= Isoquinoline alkaloids =

Isoquinoline, the parent compound of the isoquinoline alkaloids

Isoquinoline alkaloids are natural products of the group of alkaloids, which are chemically derived from isoquinoline. They form the largest group among the alkaloids.

Isoquinoline alkaloids can be further classified based on their different chemical basic structures. The most common structural types are the benzylisoquinolines and the aporphines. A total of about 2500 isoquinoline alkaloids are known, which are mainly formed by plants.

== Known examples ==
Morphine

Codeine

Papaverine

Berberine

Tubocurarine

== Occurrence in nature ==
The isoquinoline alkaloids are primarily formed in the plant families of Papaveraceae, Berberidaceae, Menispermaceae, Fumariaceae and Ranunculaceae.

The opium poppy, which belongs to the Papavaraceae family, is of great interest, since the isoquinoline alkaloids morphine, codeine, papaverine, noscapine and thebaine can be found in its latex. In addition to the opium poppy, there are other poppy plants, such as the celandine, in which isoquinoline alkaloids are found. Their latex contains berberine, which also occurs in other plant families, such as the Berberidaceae. An example of the Berberidaceae with the ingredient berberine is Berberis vulgaris.

The alkaloid tubocurarin is found in the hairy cartilage tree. There the tubocurarin is extracted from the bark and roots.

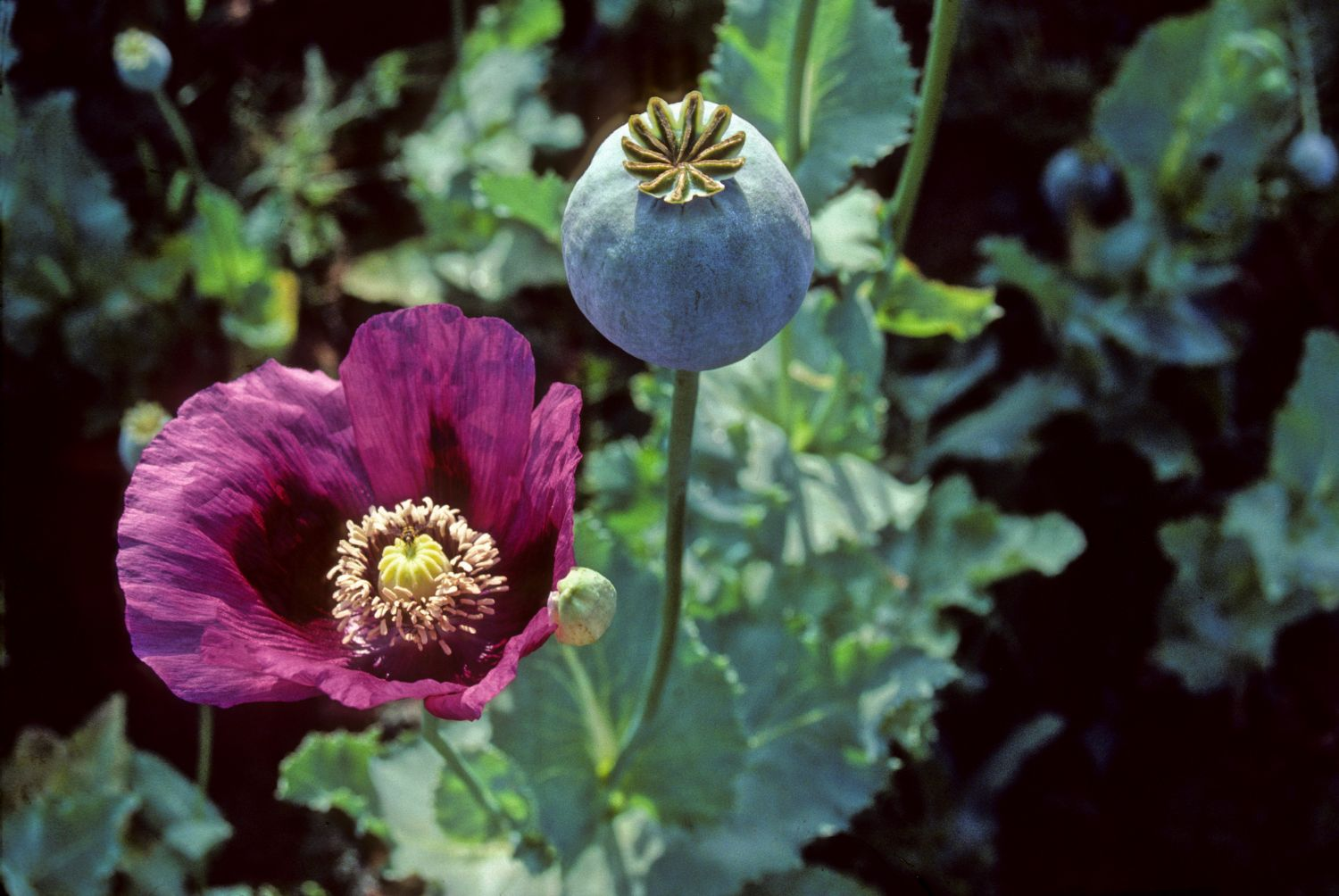
Papaver somniferum, the opium poppy, contains a wealth of alkaloids, including morphine, codeine and papaverine

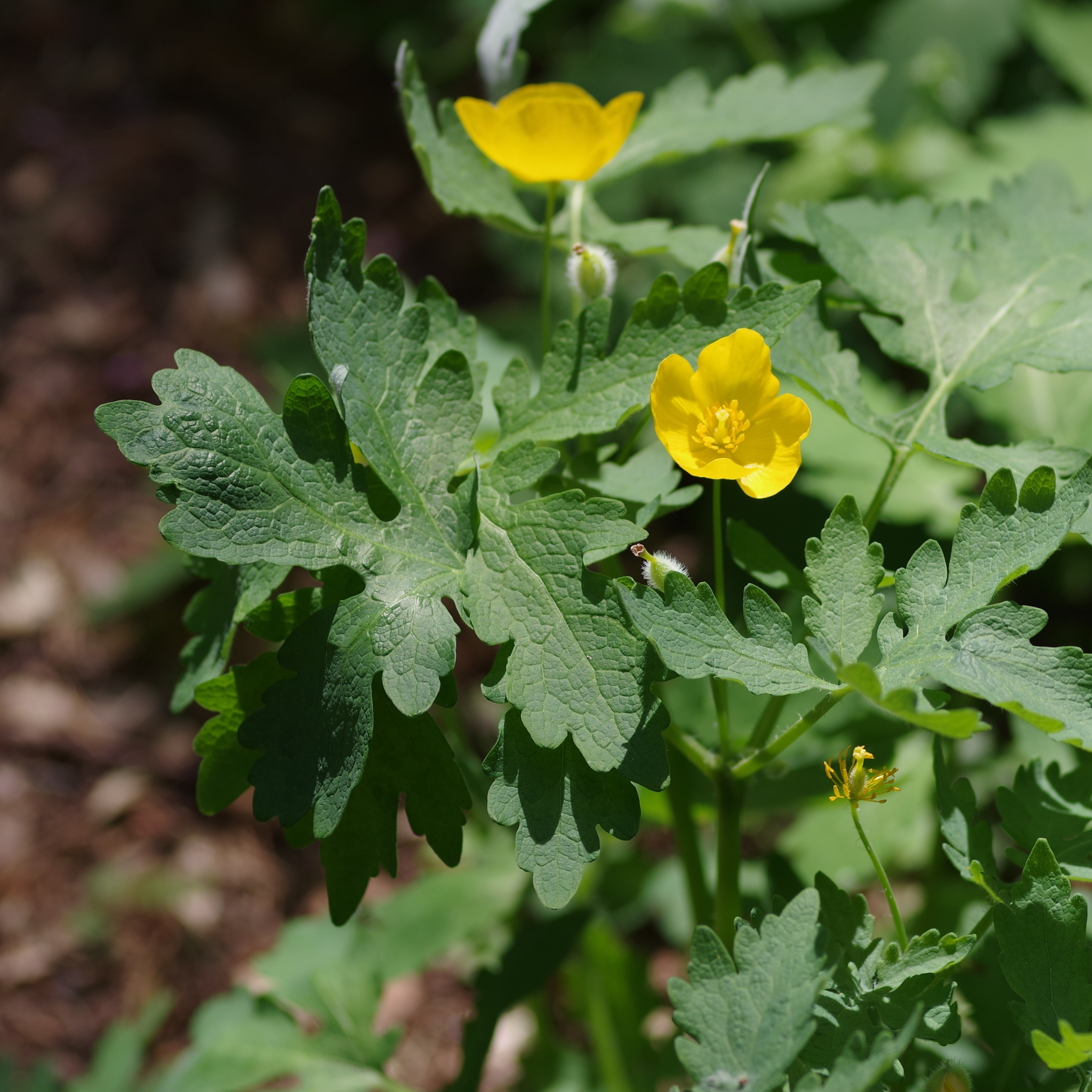
Stylophorum diphyllum, the celandine poppy, contains berberine

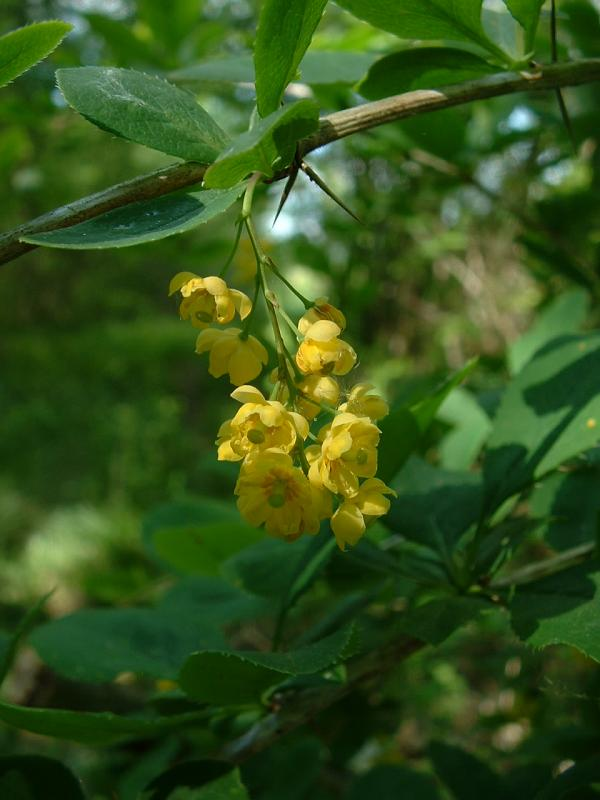
Berberis vulgaris, the common barberry, contains berberine

== Biological effect ==
In general, isoquinoline alkaloids can have different effects. The opium alkaloids may have sedative, psychotropic or analgesic properties. Morphine and codeine are indeed used as analgesics.

Papaverine, in contrast, has an antispasmodic effect if it comes from smooth muscles, as is the case in humans in the gastrointestinal tract or blood vessels. This is why it is used as an antispasmodic.

Tubocurarin impairs the transmission of stimuli in the nervous system, so that paralysis may occur in the affected organism.
