= McNeil River (Skeena River tributary) =

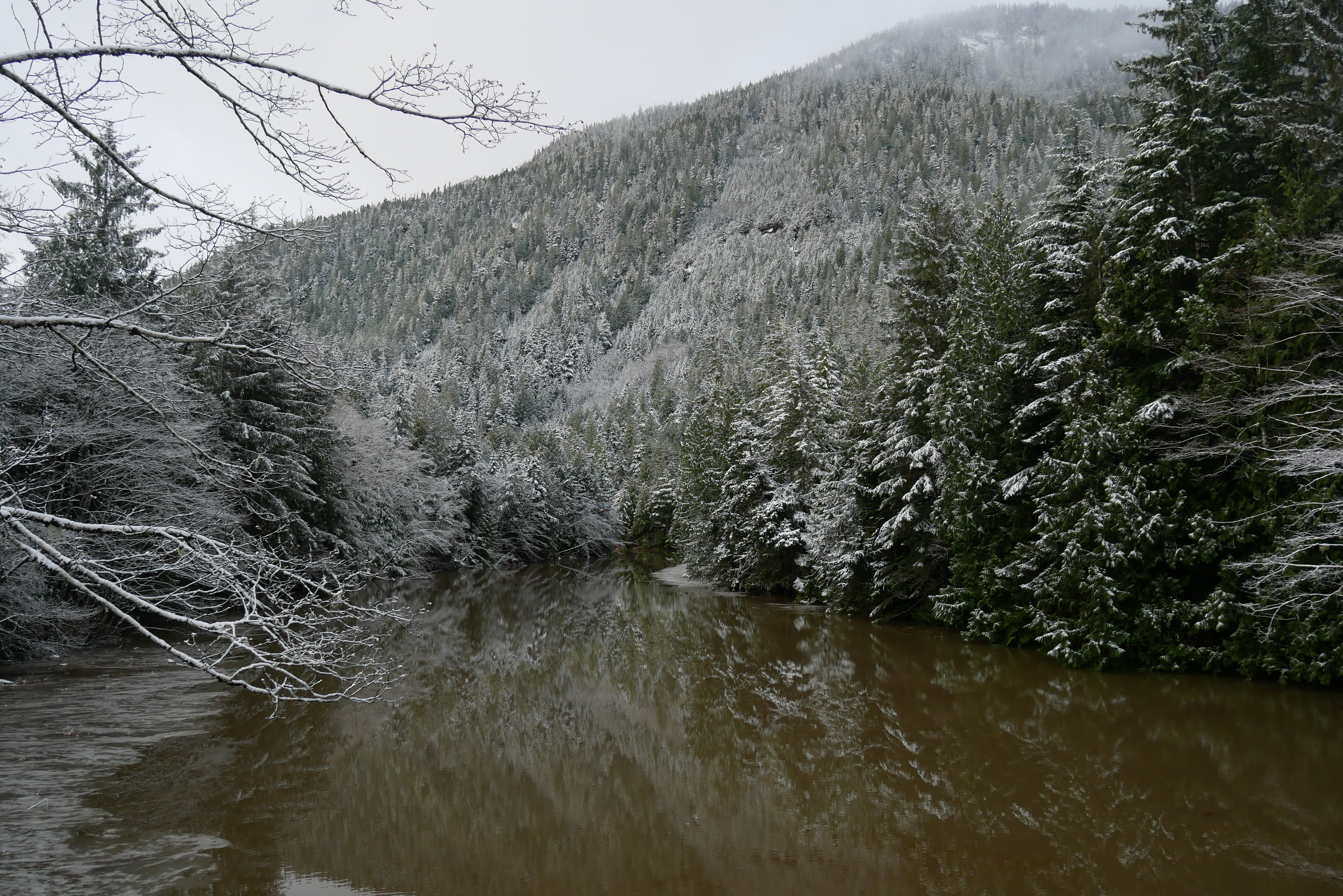
- Overlooking the McNeil River at the Gamble Creek Ecological Reserve

- Mouth of McNeil River

Location
- Country: Canada
- Province: British Columbia
- District: Range 5 Coast Land District

Physical characteristics
- Source: Minerva Lake
  - location: Coast Mountains
  - coordinates: 54°16′43″N 129°58′41″W
  - elevation: 178 m (584 ft)
- Mouth: Skeena River
  - coordinates: 54°11′48″N 129°58′56″W
  - elevation: 5 m (16 ft)
- Length: 13 km (8.1 mi)
- Basin size: 41.4 km^{2} (16.0 sq mi)
- Discharge
  - average: 4.07 m^{3}/s (144 cu ft/s)

The McNeil River is a tributary of the Skeena River in the North Coast Regional District of the province of British Columbia, Canada. It originates at Minerva Lake in the Kitimat Ranges of the Coast Mountains, and flows south about 13 km (8.1 mi) to the lower tidal reach of the Skeena River at Tyee Bank, across the Skeena from Port Essington, about 25 km (16 mi) southeast of Prince Rupert, 95 km (59 mi) southwest of Terrace, and 88 km (55 mi) northwest of Kitimat. Its watershed covers 41.4 km^{2} (16.0 sq mi), and its mean annual discharge is 4.07 m^{3}/s (144 cu ft/s).

The McNeil River's watershed is within the asserted territory of Tsimshian First Nations and the Metlakatla First Nation, both of which are affiliated with the Tsimshian Tribal Council.

== Geography ==
The McNeil River originates at Minerva Lake in the Kitimat Ranges of the Coast Mountains. The river flows south through an unnamed lake, collecting a number of tributary streams, the largest of which is Gamble Creek. Gamble Creek and the lower portion of the McNeil River flow by the Gamble Creek Ecological Reserve.

The McNeil River's watershed's biogeoclimatic ecosystem is classified as "Coastal Western Hemlock" (CWH) and "Mountain Hemlock" (MH), specifically the biogeoclimatic variants "Central Very Wet Hypermaritime" (CWHvh2), "Windward Wet Hypermaritime" (MHwh1), and "Wet Hypermaritime Parkland" (MHwhp). It is park of the Hecate Lowland ecosection.

== Natural history ==
At lower elevations the McNeil River's watershed is dominated by forests of western hemlock with some lodgepole pine and western redcedar. Some amabilis fir trees, over 300 years old, grow in the watershed. Understory flora includes Alaskan blueberry, salal, false azalea, deer fern, and mosses.

At higher elevations subalpine forests grow, with forests that tend to be scrubby and boggy. These areas are dominated by mountain hemlock and yellow cedar, with some lodgepole pine. Understory flora includes Labrador tea, bog cranberry, lingonberry, mountain heathers, cloudberry, fernleaf goldthread, rose twisted stalk, and sphagnum moss. Common plants in boggy areas include muhly (tufted deer-grass), beak-rush, deer cabbage, sundew, swamp gentian, white marsh marigold, and sphagnum moss.

Large-scale industrial logging has been conducted in the McNeil River watershed since the late 1960s. These logging operations have involved extensive clearcutting.

The McNeil River supports of runs of salmonids including coho salmon and pink salmon. Other fish species include Dolly Varden trout and cutthroat trout.

== See also ==
- List of rivers of British Columbia
