= Gamble Creek Ecological Reserve =

Ecological reserve in British Columbia, Canada

- IUCN category Ia (strict nature reserve)
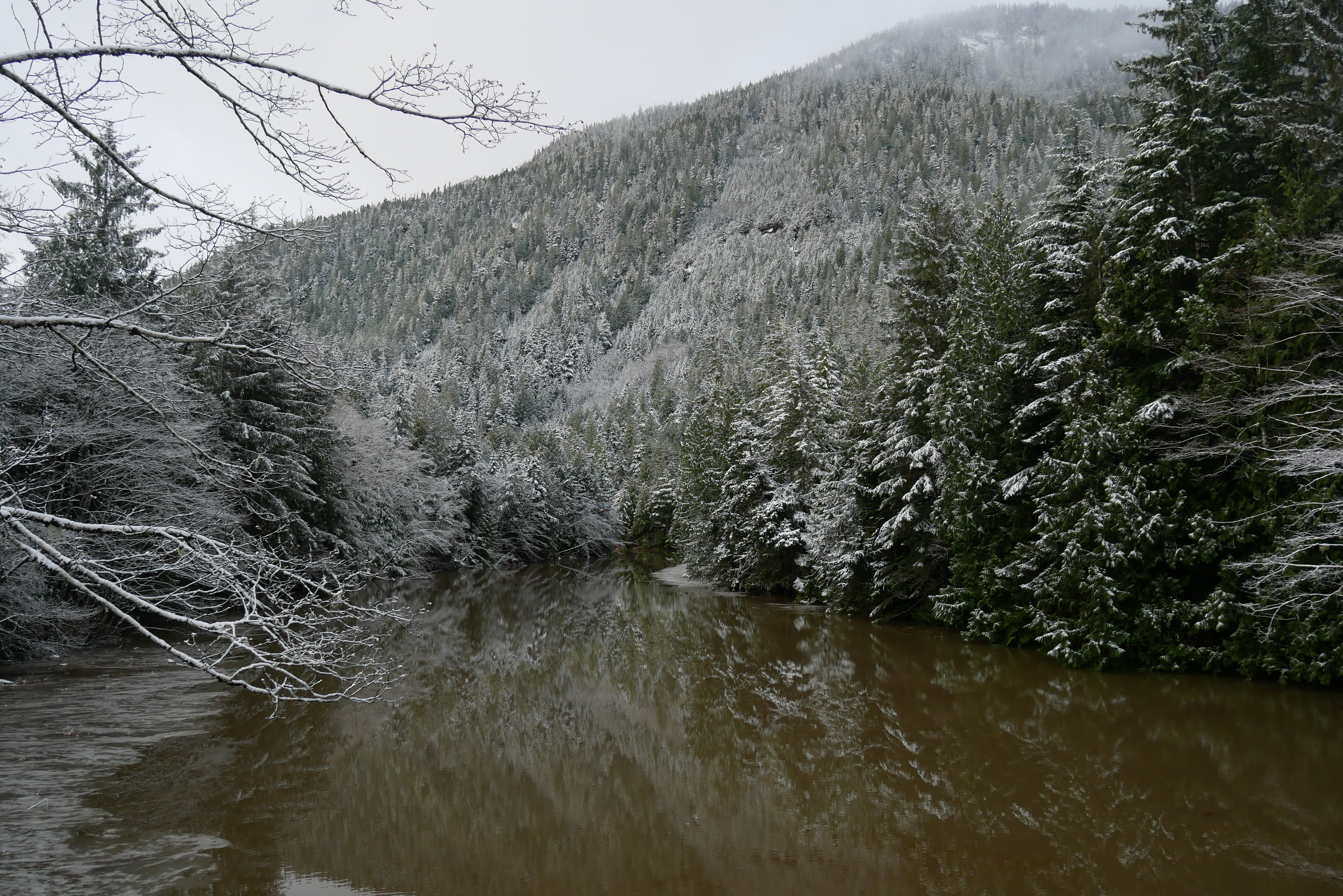
- Overlooking the McNeil River at the Gamble Creek Ecological Reserve

- Location within British Columbia
- Interactive map of Gamble Creek Ecological Reserve
- Location: British Columbia, Canada
- Coordinates: 54°12′19″N 130°01′15″W
- Area: 1,026 ha (2,540 acres)
- Designation: Ecological Reserve
- Established: 1991
- Governing body: BC Parks

Gamble Creek Ecological Reserve is an ecological reserve located within the asserted traditional territory of the Tsimshian First Nations, in British Columbia, Canada. It was established in 1991 under the Ecological Reserves Act to facilitate scientific research of tree species and ecosystem classification of north-coastal forest stands and bog vegetation. The reserve protects 1,026 hectares (2,540 acres) of lowland to mid-elevation forest and bog complexes.

== Geography ==
The reserve extends from near sea level to 900 metres (3,000 ft) elevation, and protects north coast forest and bog vegetation in both Hypermaritime Coastal Western Hemlock and Mountain Hemlock biogeoclimatic zones.

== Flora ==
Common understory plants include Labrador tea, cranberry, lingonberry, mountain heathers, cloudberry, fern-leaved goldthread, rosy twistedstalk and sphagnum moss. Common bog plants include deergrass, beak-rush, deer-cabbage, sundew, gentiana, white marsh-marigold and sphagnum moss.
