= (S)-corytuberine synthase =

Class of enzymes

Identifiers
- EC no.: 1.14.19.51

Databases
- BRENDA: enzyme data
- ExPASy: NiceZyme view
- KEGG: enzyme entry
- MetaCyc: metabolic pathway
- Rhea: reactions
- PDB structures: RCSB PDB PDBe PDBsum
Search
- PMC: articles
- PubMed: articles
- NCBI: proteins

(S)-corytuberine synthase is an enzyme purified from the plant Coptis japonica (Japanese goldthread), with EC number EC 1.14.19.51 and CYP Symbol CYP80G2. It catalyses an intramolecular C-C phenol coupling of (S)-reticuline to (S)-corytuberine in a pathway leading to magnoflorine.

(S)-reticuline
+ NADPH
O_{2}
2 H_{2}O
(S)-corytuberine
+ NADP^{+}

(S)-corytuberine synthase is a cytochrome P450 protein containing heme. It requires a partner cytochrome P450 reductase for functional expression. This uses nicotinamide adenine dinucleotide phosphate (NADPH).
