= Goldthread =

Goldthread may refer to:

- Gold thread, used in goldwork embroidery
- Coptis, or goldthread, a genus of flowering plants in the family Ranunculaceae
- Cuscuta, folk name goldthread, a genus of parasitic plants in the family Convolvulaceae
