= Biogeoclimatic zones of British Columbia =

Classification system for climatic ecosystems

The biogeoclimatic zones of British Columbia are units of a classification system used by the British Columbia Ministry of Forests for the Canadian province's fourteen different broad, climatic ecosystems. The classification system, termed Biogeoclimatic Ecosystem Classification, exists independently of other ecoregion systems, one created by the World Wildlife Fund and the other in use by Environment Canada, which is based on one created by the Commission for Environmental Cooperation (CEC) and also in use by the US Environmental Protection Agency (EPA). The system of biogeoclimatic ecosystem classification was partly created for the purpose of managing forestry resources, but is also in use by the British Columbia Ministry of Environment and Climate Change Strategy and other provincial agencies. A biogeoclimatic zone is defined as "a geographic area having similar patterns of energy flow, vegetation and soils as a result of a broadly homogenous macroclimate."

All zones are officially abbreviated in capital letters (AT for Alpine Tundra, BWBS for Boreal White and Black Spruce, and so on). Subzones, which are divisions of zones based on more regional climates, have their connotative codes in lower case with the first letter denoting relative moistness and the second relative temperature; thus the northeastern BWBS with its warm thundery summers has been mapped as BWBSmw for "moist warm" while the Alsek Ranges subzone in the northwestern panhandle, stormy in all seasons with winds blowing from glaciers, is BWBSvk for "very wet cool." Subzones may be divided into variants, each of which is denoted by a number. For example, the numerous variants of the Interior Cedar—Hemlock moist warm subzone are designated as ICHmw1, ICHmw2, etc. A variant may be divided into phases, such as ICHmc1a, the amabilis fir phase of the Interior Cedar—Hemlock moist cold subzone.

The biogeoclimatic zones of British Columbia are:

== Alpine Tundra (AT) ==
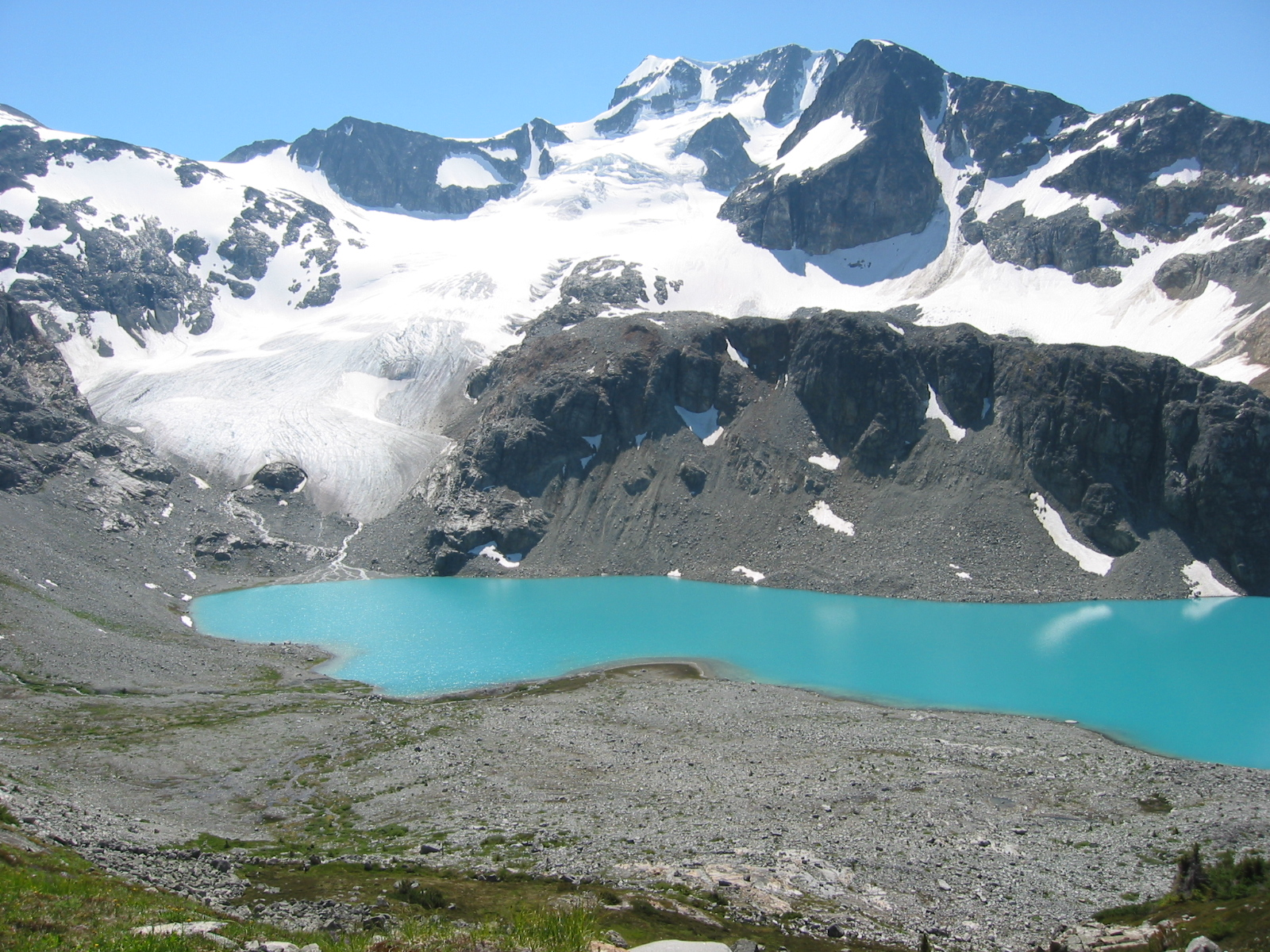
Alpine Tundra in the Coast Range, near Whistler Mountain

The Alpine Tundra zone is the harshest and least-populated biozone in the Province. It occupies the high elevations of mountainous areas, and is especially common in the Coast Range. The elevation range of this zone varies by area and is influenced both by latitude and by snowfall: in the extremely snowy southwest it starts at 1,600 metres (5,200 ft) and in the less snowy southeast, 2,250 metres (7,380 ft). In the relatively dry north, the AT starts at 1,500 metres (4,900 ft), and in the more snowy northwest it can start as low as 1,000 metres (3,300 ft). Most life is found in the lower ranges of the zone.

The terrain in this zone is dominated by ice, snow, rock, and glaciers. Glacier-related features like cirques, talus, alpine lakes and moraine are common. Climate is a major barrier to life; the growing season is extremely short. Mean average temperature usually ranges from 0 °C (32 °F) to 4 °C (39 °F), and even in summer the average temperature does not exceed 10 °C (50 °F). The zone sees heavy precipitation, usually in the form of snow.

Tree species are rarely found in this zone, and when they do grow, they take the low, sprawling Krummholz form. Shrubs are common, especially dwarf evergreen species like partridgefoot, kinnikinnick, crowberry, lingonberry, and alpine-azalea. Grasses, heath, and sedges are also present. Wetter areas and calcareous substrates see a larger variety of plant species. Higher elevations are exclusively the realm of the lichens.

Due to its harsh winters, few animals live in the zone year-round. However, in the spring, summer, and fall, many species are found. Mountain goats, big-horned sheep, stone sheep, Roosevelt elk, blacktailed deer, mule deer, elk, and caribou all take advantage of summer growth in the zone. Grey wolves follow the ungulates. Bears, such as black and grizzly, enjoy the many berries of the alpine meadows in the zone. Smaller mammals like the wolverine, hoary marmot, the endangered Vancouver Island marmot, Arctic ground squirrel, and the Siberian lemming are present. Birds of prey include the golden eagle and gyrfalcon. Ground birds such as the ptarmigan nest in the alpine zone, while other bird species like the snow bunting and rosy finch venture upwards from the treeline.

== Spruce—Willow—Birch (SWB) ==
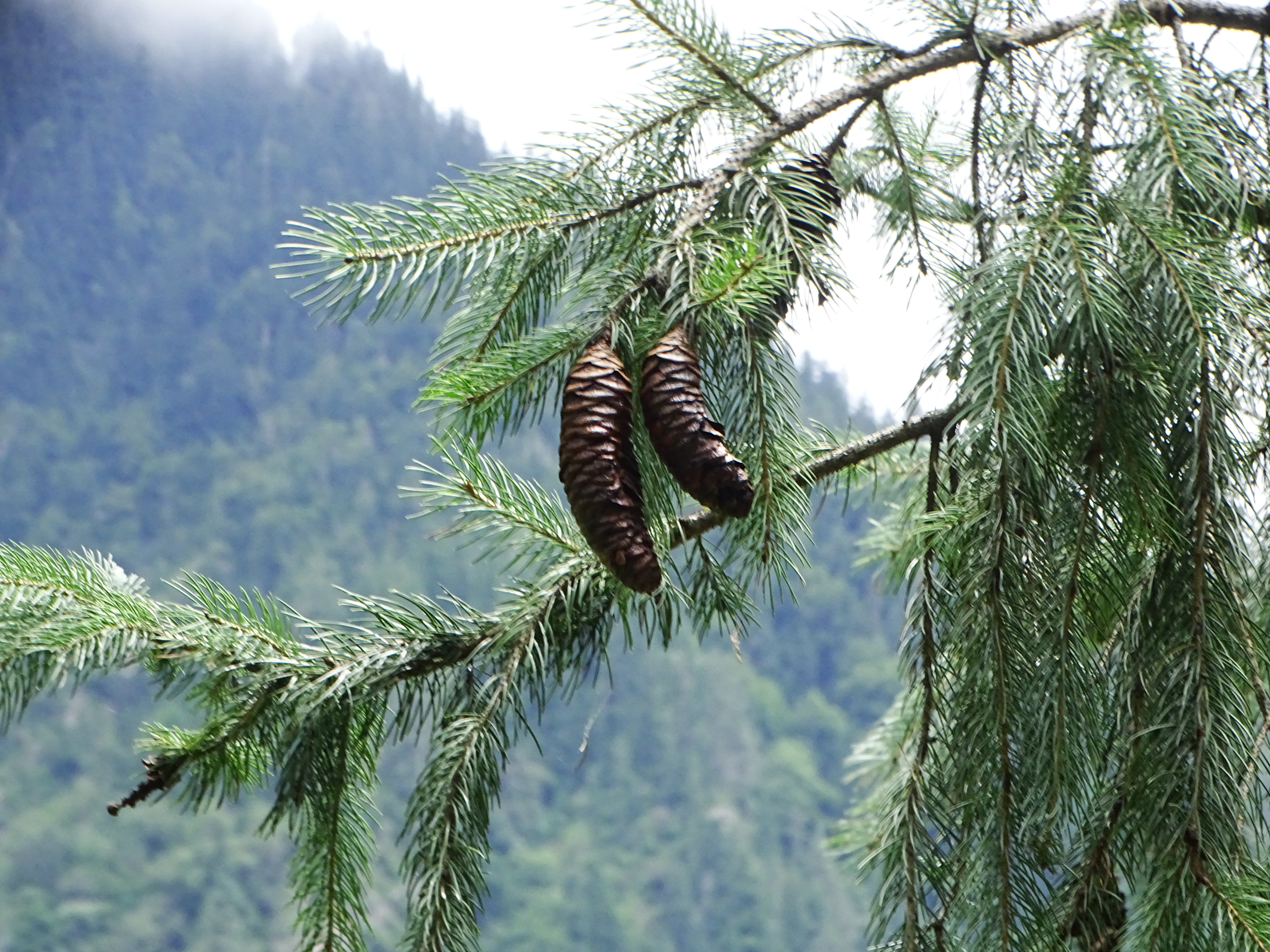
Spruce

Found only in the north of the province, this zone occurs in the sub-alpine of the Interior Mountains.

White spruce is the most abundant conifer in the Spruce—Willow—Birch (SWB) zone, except at the upper (parkland) elevations, where subalpine fir dominates. Spruces with Engelmann spruce or hybrid white × Engelmann spruce characteristics may be present, especially in areas transitional to ESSF; if they are more abundant than white spruce, the site is mapped as ESSF. Subalpine fir is the most common associate of white spruce in the SWB zone. Black spruce (Picea mariana), lodgepole pine and trembling aspen (Populus tremuloides) are relatively minor associates. Many spruce stands are quite open, with a well-developed shrub layer dominated by a variety of willows (Salix glauca, S. planifolia, S. scouleriana, S. bebbiana) and scrub birch (Betula glandulosa). Other common shrubs include Potentilla fruticosa, Shepherdia canadensis, Empetrum nigrum, Vaccinium vitis-idaea, V. caespitosum and Ledum groenlandicum. Common herbs are Linnaea borealis, Festuca altaica, Epilobium angustifolium, Lupinus arcticu and Mertensia paniculata. In addition to the feather mosses Pleurozium schreberi and Hylocomium splendens, the forest floor contains a diversity of lichens (Coates et al. 1994).

== Boreal White and Black Spruce (BWBS) ==
White spruce is the predominant tree species in the Boreal White and Black Spruce (BWBS), except in the Fort Nelson area where the poorly drained lowlands are dominated by black spruce. Engelmann spruce is absent, though some white × Engelmann hybrids may occur at southern margins of the zone bordering the SBS zone.

Mixed stands of white spruce and trembling aspen (often with a minor component of balsam poplar [Populus balsamifera], birch (Betula papyrifera, B. neoalaskana) or lodgepole pine) are the most common components of forest cover on warm mesic sites in the BWBS. On colder sites, e.g., on north-facing slopes, pure white spruce or mixtures of white and black spruces dominate. Lodgepole pine is the typical associate of white spruce on coarse-textured parent materials, while balsam poplar–spruce mixtures are frequent on floodplains. Subalpine fir is common in western parts of the zone, but is rare east of the Rockies. Wetland black spruce stands often have a minor component of slow-growing white spruce. Typical vegetation in boreal white spruce stands includes the common shrubs Rosa acicularis, Viburnum edule, Shepherdia canadensis, Salix bebbiana, and Alnus viridis, with Ribes triste and Lonicera involucrata on wet sites, and Ledum groenlandicum and Vaccinium vitis-idaea on cold sites. Characteristic herbs are Linnaea borealis, Rubus pubescens, Mertensia paniculata, Petasites palmatus, Pyrola asarifolia, Cornus canadensis and Calamagrostis canadensis, with Equisetum spp. on wet sites. The thick carpet of moss is of Hylocomium splendens, Pleurozium schreberi and Ptilium crista-castrensis, and the lichen Peltigera aphthosa (Coates et al. 1994).

== Sub-Boreal Pine—Spruce (SBPS) ==
White spruce is a distant second in importance to lodgepole pine in the Sub-Boreal Pine-Spruce zone (SBPS). It occurs most commonly in the understorey to pine, but scattered stands dominated by white spruce can be found on moist sites. Pure Engelmann spruce is absent, and any hybrids appear to have mainly white spruce characteristics.

Lodgepole pine is the most common associate of white spruce in the SBPS. White spruce also occurs with trembling aspen in seral stands, and mixtures of black and white spruces occupy cold low-lying sites. Floodplain stands of black cottonwood (Populus balsamifera ssp. trichocarpa) and white spruce occur uncommonly.

Typical understorey vegetation of moist spruce ecosystems includes the shrubs Lonicera involucrata, Rosa acicularis, Shepherdia canadensis, Juniperus communis, Salix glauca, Betula glandulosa, Ribes lacustre, R. hudsonianum and Viburnum edule, and the herbs Cornus canadensis, Linnaea borealis, Epilobium angustifolium, Petasites palmatus, Fragaria virginiana, Equisetum arvense, Calamagrostis canadensis and Mitella nuda. In addition to the usual feather mosses (Pleurozium schreberi, Hylocomium splendens and Ptilium crista-castrensis) the moss layer characteristically includes Aulacomnium palustre and Peltigera, Cladina and Cladonia lichens (Coates et al. 1994).

== Sub-Boreal Spruce (SBS) ==
Interior spruce (mostly hybrid white × Engelmann, with some pure white spruce) is dominant throughout the many subzones of the Sub-Boreal Spruce (SBS) zone.

Lodgepole pine is the most common associate of interior spruce in the SBS. Subalpine fir is abundant in cooler, moister subzones. Trembling aspen and Douglas-fir (Pseudotsuga menziesii var. glauca) are often found with spruce on warmer, drier, more southerly subzones. Black cottonwood is the main associate of interior spruce on active floodplain sites, and mixtures of white and black spruces are common on wetlands.

Understorey vegetation in mesic spruce stands typically includes a moderately well-developed shrub layer dominated by Vaccinium membranaceum, Rubus parviflorus, Viburnum edule, Rosa acicularis, Alnus viridis, a variety of herbs (Cornus canadensis, Clintonia uniflora, Rubus pubescens, Rubus pedatus, Arnica cordifolia, Maianthemum racemosa, Orthilia secunda, Aralia nudicaulis) and a well-developed carpet of feathermosses (Pleurozium schreberi, Ptilium crista-castrensis, Hylocomiium splendens, Rhytidiadelphus triquetrus). Wetter spruce sites have Lonicera involucrata, Cornus sericea, Gymnocarpium dryopteris, Tiarella trifoliata, Equisetum arvense and Mnium mosses. Characteristic species of spruce bog, fen, or swamp ecosystems are Salix spp., Betula glandulosa, Ledum groenlandicum, Carex spp. and Sphagnum moss (Coates et al. 1994).

== Mountain Hemlock (MH) ==
In coastal areas the MH is transitional between productive low-elevation forests and treeless alpine tundra (AT). Unlike the interior high-elevation transition zones (SWB, ESSF), spruce is usually scarce or absent and mountain hemlock is abundant. Yellow cedar is also common, especially in the more maritime areas. The most common fir is Pacific silver fir and subalpine fir may also be plentiful. Fir is absent on Haida Gwaii. Some western hemlock may be present, especially at lower elevations where its proportion of hemlock cover may reach 50%. If western hemlock cover exceeds 50% of total hemlock cover, the site is considered to be within the CWH.

The westernmost subzone, wet hypermaritime (MHwh) on Haida Gwaii, is atypical for its absence of fir and relative abundance of spruce. In this case the spruce is Sitka spruce, which forms a site series with mountain hemlock and reedgrass on fresh rich sites. Mainland sites formerly mapped as MHwh are being reevaluated.

Windward moist maritime (MHmm1) is dominated by mountain hemlock and Pacific silver fir. Yellow cedar places third in abundance and western hemlock becomes increasingly significant with decreasing elevation. Leeward moist maritime (MHmm2) has all of the windward tree species, plus subalpine fir.

== Engelmann Spruce—Subalpine Fir (ESSF) ==
Over most of southern British Columbia, spruce dominates the canopy of mature stands in the Engelmann Spruce—Subalpine Fir (ESSF) zone, while subalpine fir is most abundant in the understorey. At higher elevations, particularly in the north and in wet, heavy snowfall areas, subalpine fir dominates and spruce is a minor component. In southern British Columbia, the spruce is pure Engelmann, but white spruce characteristics become increasingly evident northward, first only at lower elevations, then at all elevations. At the northern limits of the ESSF, Engelmann spruce characteristics are rare.

Subalpine fir is ubiquitous in the ESSF and is the most common associate of spruce throughout. Lodgepole pine is the most common seral species. Deciduous species, such as trembling aspen, paper birch, and black cottonwood, are present but uncommon. Whitebark pine and, in southeastern British Columbia only, limber pine and alpine larch occur in association with spruce, especially in the driest ecosystems, usually at high elevations, where spruce is not abundant. At low elevations in the ESSF, associates of spruce are Douglas-fir, western redcedar (Thuja plicata), western hemlock (Tsuga heterophylla) and western white pine. Mountain hemlock and amabilis fir (Abies amabilis) are also found with spruce in the ESSF, principally adjacent to the Mountain Hemlock Zone. The dominant plant community in the ESSF has an understorey of ericaceous shrubs, mainly Rhododendron albiflorum, Vaccinium membranaceum, and Menziesia ferruginea, with Vaccinium ovalifolium in high-precipitation areas and V. scoparium in dry areas. Ribes lacustre, Oplopanax horridus and Lonicera involucrata are common shrubs on moist to wet sites. Herbs characteristic of the ESSF forest include Valeriana sitchensis, Gymnocarpium dryopteris, Rubus pedatus, Streptopus roseus, Veratrum viride, Athyrium filix-femina, Cornus canadensis, Lycopodium annotinum, Tiarella spp. and Arnica cordifolia. Dominant bryophytes are Pleurozium schreberi, Dicranum spp., and Barbilophozia spp. Lichens are abundant on the forest floor and include Peltigera spp., Nephroma arcticum, and Cladonia spp. At the upper parkland elevations of the ESSF, closed forest and tree islands of spruce and subalpine fir are interspersed with moist herb meadows and drier ericaceous heath. The meadows typically include the herbs: Valeriana sitchensis, Veratrum viride, Senecio triangularis, Lupinus arcticus, Thalictrum occidentale, Epilobium angustifolium, Pedicularis bracteosum, Castelleja miniata, Erigeron peregrinus, Carex spp. and Luzula spp. Subalpine heath includes Empetrum nigrum, Cassiope mertensiana, C. tetragona, Phyllodoce empetriformis, P. glandulifera, and Vaccinium caespitosum (Coates et al. 1994).

== Montane Spruce (MS) ==
Overlooking Browne Lake on a Calm Rainy Morning in late Autumn

The MS occurs at mid elevations in the south and central interior in the lee of the coast mountains. Its climate is characterized by cold winters and short warm summers, and is warmer in all seasons than in the Engelmann Spruce—Subalpine Fir zone. Hybrid spruce and subalpine fir dominate climax forests. Younger (seral) stands are thick with lodgepole pine to such a degree that the species is one of the zone's most important natural resources. Douglas-fir is present, especially in warmer microclimates. Western larch is present in some southeastern areas, and western red cedar may be seen in moist sections. This zone provides important summer and fall habitat for deer and moose and important winter habitat for mountain caribou.

== Bunchgrass (BG) ==
The Bunchgrass zone is the warmer of the two non-forest biogeoclimatic zones in British Columbia. It is most commonly found in deeply incised valleys east of the Coast Mountains and within their rain shadow. Drought, not cold as in the Alpine Tundra (AT), inhibits forest or woodland development.

Winters are moderately cold throughout the BG, with frequent though usually light precipitation. Incidence and quantity of precipitation decrease after January, and spring months see little rain. A second rain peak occurs in June, but the quantity rarely matches evaporation; therefore, winter is the primary moisture recharge season. Summers are warm in northern parts of the BG, and hot in low-elevation southern areas such as the Thompson River valley between Kamloops and Lytton.

The bunchgrass plants tend to be widely spaced. Between them a cryptogam crust is present, and shrub cover under climax conditions may reach 15%. Weeds and cacti often replace bunchgrass on overgrazed land.

Although this zone is officially non-forest, trees may be seen here and there. Groves of trembling aspen are occasional at higher elevations, and riparian areas can be lush with aspen, black cottonwood, mountain alder, willows, and many associated understorey plants. Scattered individuals and groves of ponderosa pine form a parkland in some areas, and Douglas-fir can also be present in a similar way.

Despite the limited extent of the BG, wildlife density and diversity are very high. This is credited to the juxtaposition of different habitat types—grassland, shrub-steppe, riparian, and forest. The BG represents "fingers into Canada" of the intermontane steppe which is extensive in the Great Basin of the western United States, and as such it is frequented by animal species at their northern limits. These include pallid bat, burrowing owl and short-horned lizard. Their ranges overlap Canadian species near their southern limits, most prominently snowy owl and gyrfalcon.

Soils in the Bunchgrass zone belong to the Chernozem Order with all four great groups (Brown, Dark Brown, Black, Dark Gray) represented.

== Ponderosa Pine (PP) ==
Ponderosa pine is the most abundant species on mesic or xeric terrain. Douglas-fir is common, and can be dominant on moist sites. White spruce or white × Engelmann hybrids are found only rarely within the Ponderosa Pine (PP) zone, and occur in cool, moist, sheltered situations, e.g., steep, north-facing canyon headwalls (Coates et al. 1994). Two subzones are recognized: the very dry hot (PPxh) around Lytton, Lillooet, Kamloops and the Okanagan Valley south of Vernon, and the dry hot (PPdh) found in or near Midway, Grand Forks, and parts of the Rocky Mountain Trench from just north of Cranbrook south to the Koocanusa Reservoir. Soils of the PP zone are usually Dark Brown Chernozems, Orthic Eutric Brunisols, or Eluviated Eutric Brunisols.

== Interior Douglas-Fir (IDF) ==
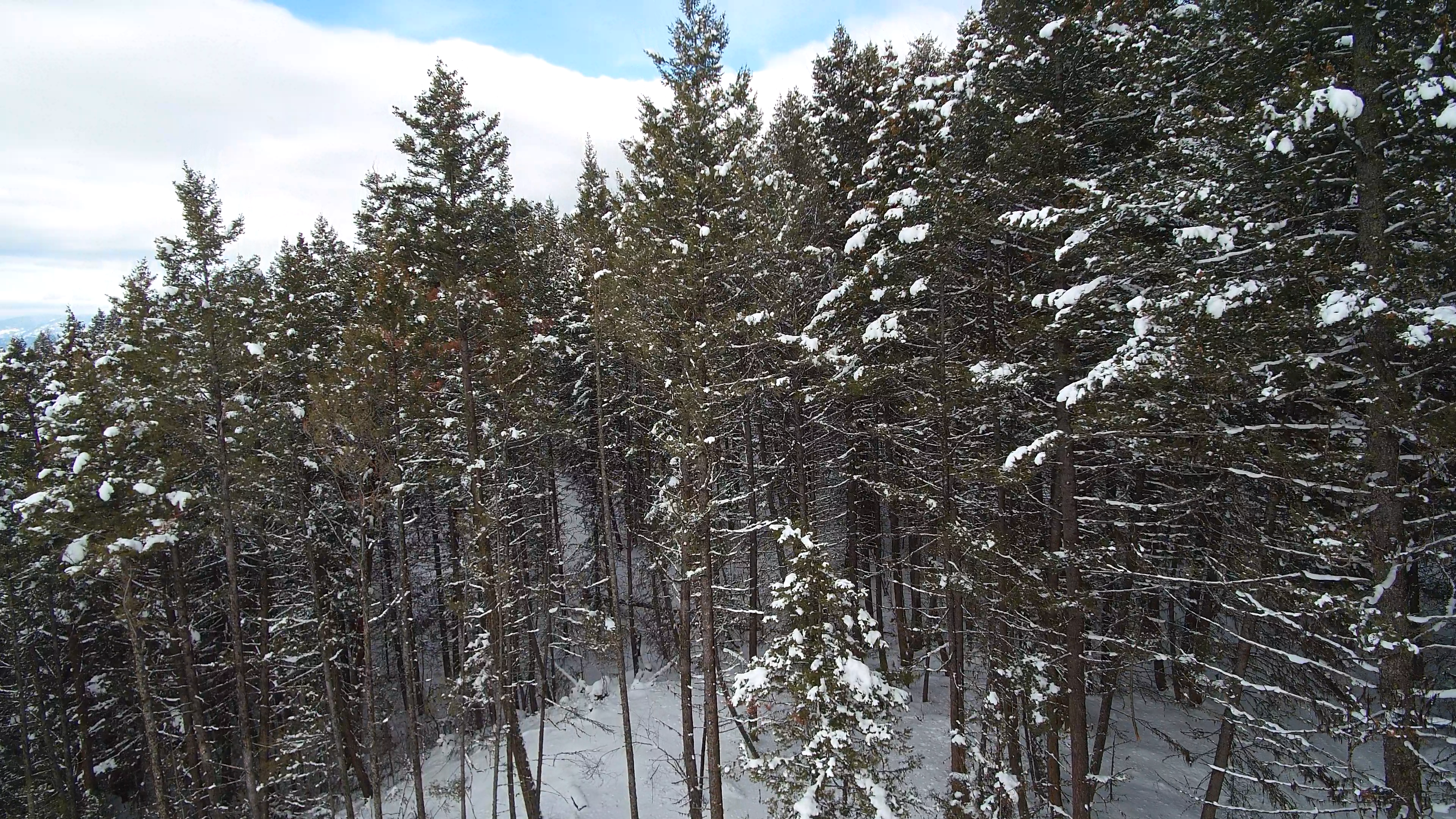
An aerial view of the Interior Douglas-fir forests of Lake Country

Douglas-fir is the most abundant and characteristic tree of the IDF. Lodgepole pine is also abundant and often co-dominates with Douglas-fir. Ponderosa pine is co-occurs in the southern, lower elevation parts of the zone. White spruce occurs mainly in wetter subzones and at higher elevations transitional to the Montane Spruce, Sub-Boreal Spruce, and Engelmann Spruce–Subalpine Fir Zones.

Western redcedar, western larch, and grand fir (Abies grandis) occur in the southeastern part of the zone. Trembling aspen, paper birch, and black cottonwood are common seral species, and bigleaf maple is present in some parts of the southwestern coastal transition area (wet warm subzone or IDFww). Mixed shrub or horsetail-dominated plant communities are typical of moist, rich ecosystems that include spruce. Common shrub associates include: Ribes lacustre, Lonicera involucrata, Cornus sericea, Rosa acicularis, Symphoricarpos albus and Acer glabrum. The well-developed herb layer contains Linnaea borealis, Cornus canadensis, Aralia nudicaulis, Actaea rubra, and Osmorhiza chilensis, together with Equisetum and Carex spp. on wetter sites. Bog forests with Sphagnum spp., Ledum groenlandicum, and Gaultheria hispidula are infrequent but usually have a tree canopy of pure spruce (Coates et al. 1994).

== Coastal Douglas-Fir (CDF) ==
Coastal Douglas-fir is often predominant in southern coastal British Columbia, particularly on eastern Vancouver Island, The Gulf Islands, and the Sechelt Peninsula. The climate is "Csb" Cool Mediterranean, and the droughty summers inhibit development of a climax Western Red Cedar-Grand Fir association. Arbutus or Shore Pine accompany Douglas-Fir on dry, nutrient-poor to medium sites; Garry Oak occupies some dry rich sites, especially around Victoria. Other prominent deciduous trees include Bigleaf Maple and Western Flowering Dogwood. The only official subzone is moist maritime (CDFmm). Victoria, Oak Bay, and southern parts of Saanich are drier than other parts of the CDF, and had a much higher proportion of oak-grass vegetation prior to settlement, but they have since become so heavily urbanized that no one has bothered to map a drier subzone for them.

== Interior Cedar—Hemlock (ICH) ==
The ICH has a greater diversity of tree species than any other interior zone. Western hemlock and western redcedar are climax species in most variants, and interior spruce often accompanies them as a secondary component. Subalpine fir is a major associate to the north. Black cottonwood, lodgepole pine, trembling aspen, and paper birch are found with spruce in seral communities throughout most of the zone. In the central and southern ICH, spruce may also occur in association with Douglas-fir, western larch, western white pine, and grand fir. A typical spruce or redcedar–spruce stand on a seepage ecosystem has a diverse shrub layer dominated by Oplopanax horridus, Ribes lacustre, Cornus sericea, Acer glabrum, Rubus parviflorus, Viburnum edule, and Lonicera involucrata. Characteristic herbs include Gymnocarpium dryopteris, Athyrium filix-femina, Tiarella unifoliata, Viola glabella, Circaea alpina, Streptopus spp., Osmorhiza chilensis, Dryopteris assimilis, and Actaea rubra. On swampier sites, Lysichiton americanum, Equisetum spp., and Rhytidiadelphus triquetrus and Hylocomium splendens are found. Seral communities on mesic sites in the north of the ICH have a mixed overstorey of spruce, subalpine fir, lodgepole pine, paper birch, and trembling aspen. Typical shrubs are: Rubus parviflorus, Viburnum edule, Rosa acicularis, Paxistima myrsinites, Amelanchier alnifolia, Shepherdia canadensis, Alnus viridis, and Vaccinium membranaceum. Major herbs include: Cornus canadensis, Clintonia uniflora, Aralia nudicaulis, Lathyrus nevadensis, Rubus pubescens, Smilacina spp., Orthilia secunda, Osmorhiza chilensis, and Petasites palmatus. The moss carpet is dominated by Rhytidiadelphus triquetrus, Ptilium crista-castrensis, Pleurozium schreberi, and Hylocomium splendens (Coates et al. 1994).

Interior spruce is a common secondary component of Interior Cedar—Hemlock (ICH) forests. It is most abundant in the northern and eastern parts of the zone, close to the Sub-Boreal Spruce Zone, or at high elevations bordering the Engelmann Spruce–Subalpine Fir Zone. It is least abundant in drier parts of the ICH. White spruce, Engelmann spruce, and their hybrids are all present, Engelmann spruce dominating in southeastern British Columbia, particularly at high elevations, and white spruce dominating in the north. In the coast–interior transition of northwestern British Columbia, interior spruce hybridizes with Sitka spruce and their cross is called Roche spruce.

In some subzones either the cedar or the hemlock can be scarce to the point of absence. The ICHdk (dry cool) around Canim Lake and the ICHmk (moist cool) in the Rocky Mountains lack hemlock, while in the northwest the ICHvc (very wet cold) along parts of the Bell-Irving, Iskut and Stikine rivers is beyond the range of cedar. Cedar is also absent, and hemlock locally scarce, in the area mapped as ICHwc (wet cold) around Bob Quinn Lake; forests tend to strongly resemble those of the Sub-Boreal Spruce zone and a Bob Quinn Lake phase (ICHwc(a)) has been proposed. Hemlock is easily seen along the Stewart-Cassiar Highway at Thomas Creek, but drops out within a kilometre northward as the hitherto-scarce lodgepole pine becomes abundant; this marks an abrupt change to the BWBS zone.

== Coastal Western Hemlock (CWH) ==
A very productive rain-fed forest occurs along the British Columbia coast from Haida Gwaii and Stewart south to Metchosin on Vancouver Island. It also extends inland along river valleys from coastal parts of Alaska, crossing into British Columbia as far north as the Chilkat River. Western hemlock is a dominant climax species throughout. Western red cedar is present from the Craig Headwaters Protected Area south. Douglas-fir is often present and sometimes dominant in warmer, drier sections as far north as Kemano, while Sitka spruce is important in wet areas near tidewater. Other wet-climate trees include yellow-cedar and Pacific silver fir. Red alder is the most abundant deciduous tree, and black cottonwood also thrives in most places. In southern parts, bigleaf maple and western flowering dogwood are locally prominent.

The Coastal Western Hemlock zone is divided into subzones along gradients of continentality:

- hypermaritime subzones comprise the outer coasts, from Haida Gwaii and Prince Rupert south to Port Renfrew. Hypermaritime forests are characterized by deer fern, yellow-cedar, fern-leaved goldthread, step moss, and lanky moss.
- maritime subzones, which lie inland from areas of heaviest marine dominance, include heavily populated southern areas such as Campbell River, Comox, (and the Lazo Marsh-North East Comox Wildlife Management Area), Courtenay, Port Alberni, and Vancouver. Moist maritime (CWHmm) forests are characterized by species including amabilis fir and thinleaf huckleberry. The driest maritime subzone (CWHxm1), with its often-dominant Douglas-fir and frequent grand fir plus occasional arbutus and a few Garry oak populations, strongly resembles the neighbouring Coastal Douglas-fir zone (CDFmm) but a key characteristic of any CWH subzone is its superior hemlock reproduction.
- submaritime subzones are restricted to the leeward side of the Coast Mountains, and are transitional to interior zones. Submaritime forests are characterized by the scarcity of typically coastal species such as salal and yellow-cedar, and the presence of typically interior or continental species like red-stemmed feathermoss and queen’s cup. Subzones are classified not by total annual precipitation but by effective moisture status. Snowy winters and cool summers (with consequent low evaporation rates) at higher elevations or in northern areas earn a wet submaritime (CWHws) classification even though total annual precipitation may be lower than in some parts of the dry subzone (CWHds) where summer is warm or hot throughout. A very dry subzone (CWHxs) has been proposed for part of the Skagit valley.

== See also ==
- List of forest regions and districts of British Columbia
