= Coptis quinquesecta =

Scientific classification
- Kingdom: Plantae
- Clade: Tracheophytes
- Clade: Angiosperms
- Clade: Eudicots
- Order: Ranunculales
- Family: Ranunculaceae
- Genus: Coptis
- Species: C. quinquesecta

Binomial name
- Coptis quinquesecta W.T.Wang

Species of flowering plant

Coptis quinquesecta is a critically endangered species of goldthread native to Jinping County, Yunnan, China and locally in northern Vietnam. China has it as a national key thread species in order to conserve it. Its chloroplasts have 79 protein coding genes, 30 RNA transferring genes, as well as four ribosomal RNA genes adding up to a total of 113 genes. Coptis quinquesecta is used as a medicinal herb in folk medicine. It contains berberine and coptisine, which purportedly treats bacterial infections, the effects of diabetes, and high blood pressure.
