= Browne Lake Provincial Park =

Provincial park in British Columbia, Canada

- IUCN category II (national park)
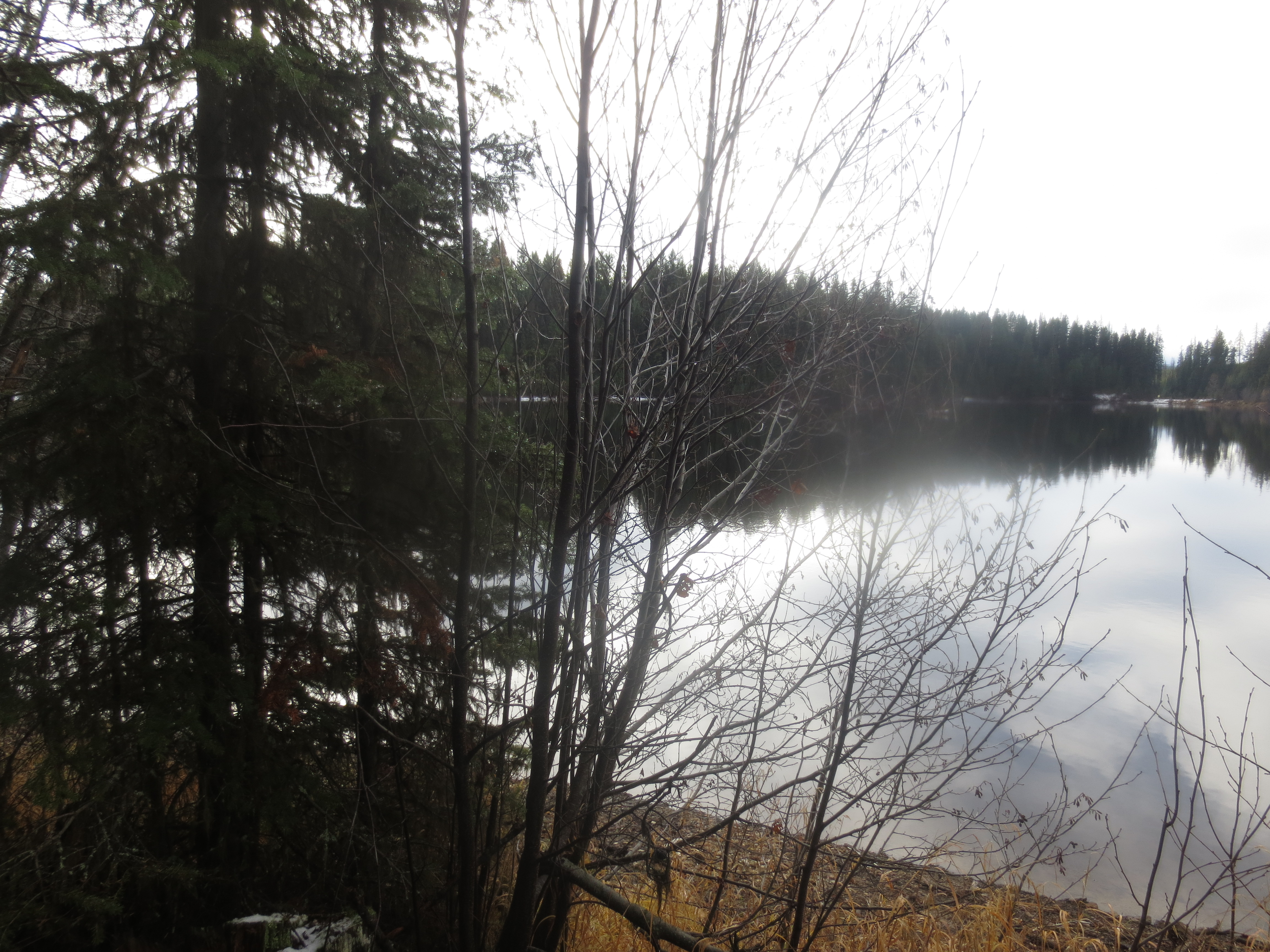
- Late Autumn view

- Location within British Columbia Location within Regional District of Central Okanagan
- Interactive map of Browne Lake Provincial Park
- Location: Central Okanagan, British Columbia, Canada
- Nearest city: Kelowna
- Coordinates: 49°49′29″N 119°11′14″W
- Area: 47 ha (120 acres)
- Established: 2004
- Governing body: BC Parks

Browne Lake Provincial Park is a provincial park in British Columbia, Canada, located 22 km east-southeast of Kelowna in the Okanagan Highland, near Big White Ski Resort and between the heads of Hydraulic and Grouse Creeks. Its size is 47 hectares, and when combined with the Brown Lake Ecological Reserve, the total protected area is 161 hectares.

== History ==
The park was established in 2004 by Order-in-Council, to protect the Interior Douglas-fir-Montane Spruce transition forest.

== Brown Lake Ecological Reserve ==
Browne Lake Ecological Reserve, comprising 114 hectares, lies to its northwest, and had been established in 1973, to protect a wet meadow ecosystem and surrounding forest in the Interior Cedar Hemlock zone. Unlike the provincial park, the reserve is closed to hunting.
