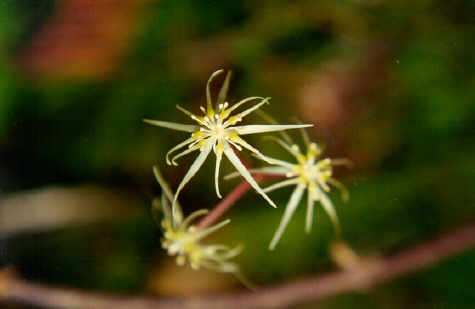

Scientific classification
- Kingdom: Plantae
- Clade: Tracheophytes
- Clade: Angiosperms
- Clade: Eudicots
- Order: Ranunculales
- Family: Ranunculaceae
- Genus: Coptis
- Species: C. occidentalis

Binomial name
- Coptis occidentalis (Nutt.) Torr. & A.Gray

= Coptis occidentalis =

Species of flowering plant

Coptis occidentalis, the Idaho goldthread, is a species of flowering plant native to western North America. It is a member of the buttercup family. This plant has also been known under the binomial Chrysocoptis occidentalis and the common name western goldthread.

The Idaho goldthread is a spring flowering plant, usually found in moist coniferous forests.
