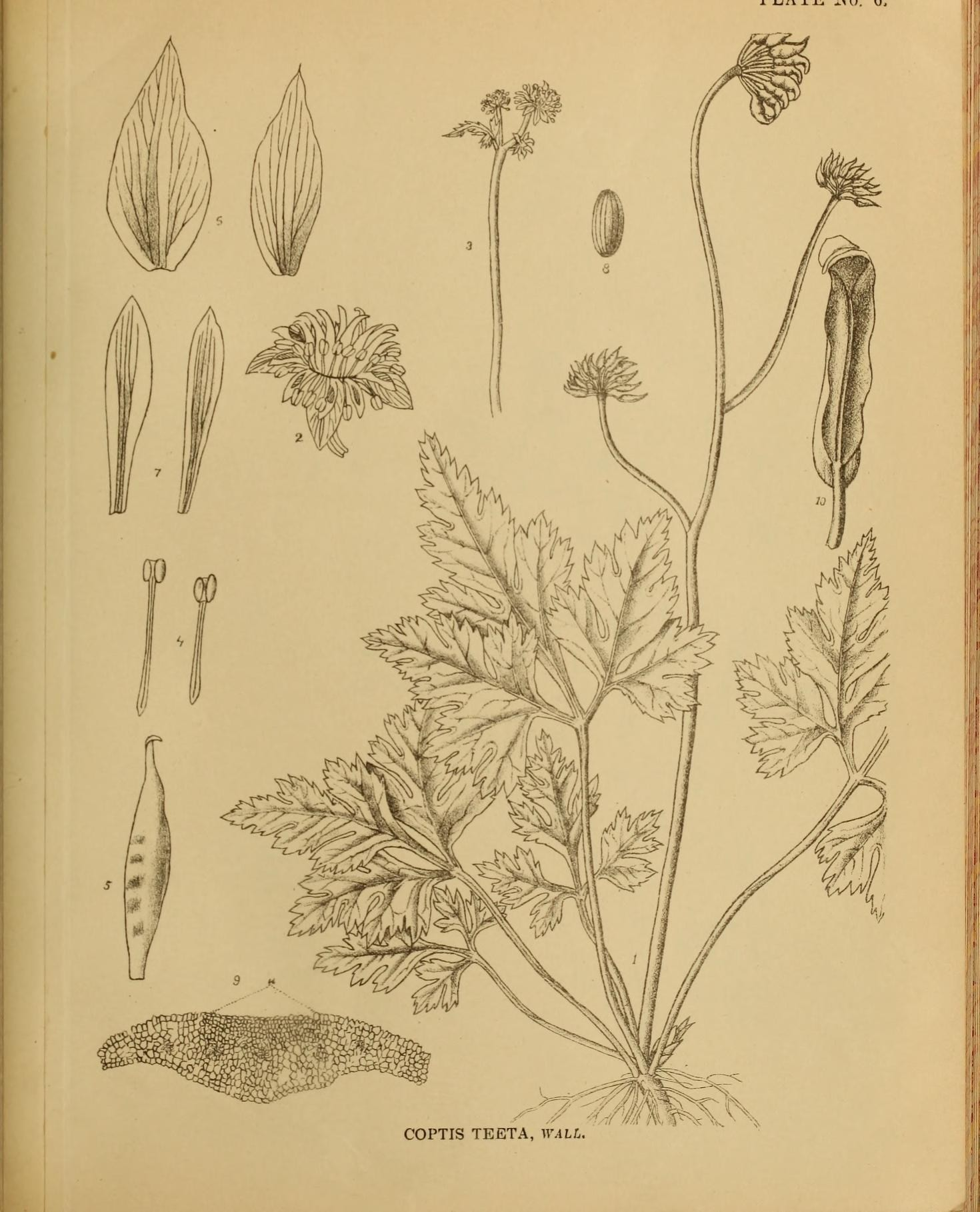

Conservation status
- Endangered (IUCN 3.1)

Scientific classification
- Kingdom: Plantae
- Clade: Tracheophytes
- Clade: Angiosperms
- Clade: Eudicots
- Order: Ranunculales
- Family: Ranunculaceae
- Genus: Coptis
- Species: C. teeta

Binomial name
- Coptis teeta Wall.

Synonyms
- Coptis teetoides

= Coptis teeta =

Species of flowering plant

Coptis teeta is a rare species of flowering plant in the buttercup family.

== Medicinal uses ==
It is a species of importance in Chinese herbology. Known as Yunnan goldthread (Chinese: 雲南黃連), its rhizome is used as an antimicrobial and anti-inflammatory.

== Habitat ==
A number of factors contribute to its endangerment. It is endemic to a very small area in the eastern Himalayas where its habitat is rapidly declining, due in part to deforestation, it is over-collected for medicinal use, and its reproductive success is low. The plant is cultivated on a small scale in Yunnan using techniques that aim to conserve the species within its natural habitat. The Lisu people of the local area earn much of their income from cultivation of the plant, which they grow using traditional agroforestry methods that have little adverse impact on the ecosystem.
