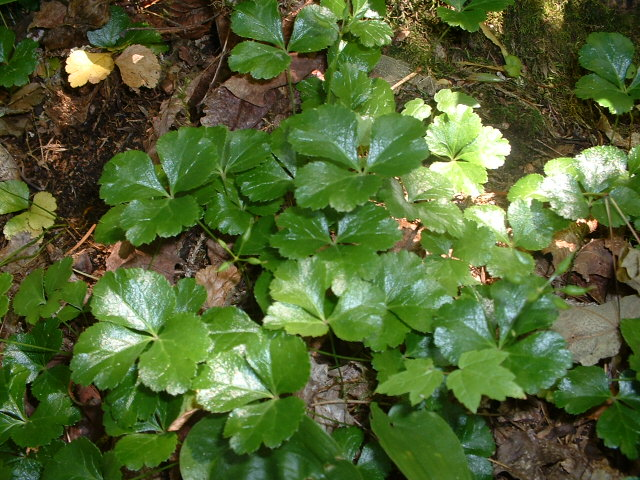
- Coptis trifolia, Pancake Bay, Ontario

Conservation status
- Least Concern (IUCN 3.1)

- Secure (NatureServe)

Scientific classification
- Kingdom: Plantae
- Clade: Tracheophytes
- Clade: Angiosperms
- Clade: Eudicots
- Order: Ranunculales
- Family: Ranunculaceae
- Genus: Coptis
- Species: C. trifolia

Binomial name
- Coptis trifolia Salisb.

Synonyms
- Anemone groenlandica O.F.Müll.; Coptis trifolia f. plena K.Imai; Helleborus trifolius L.

= Coptis trifolia =

Threeleaf goldthread

Species of flowering plant

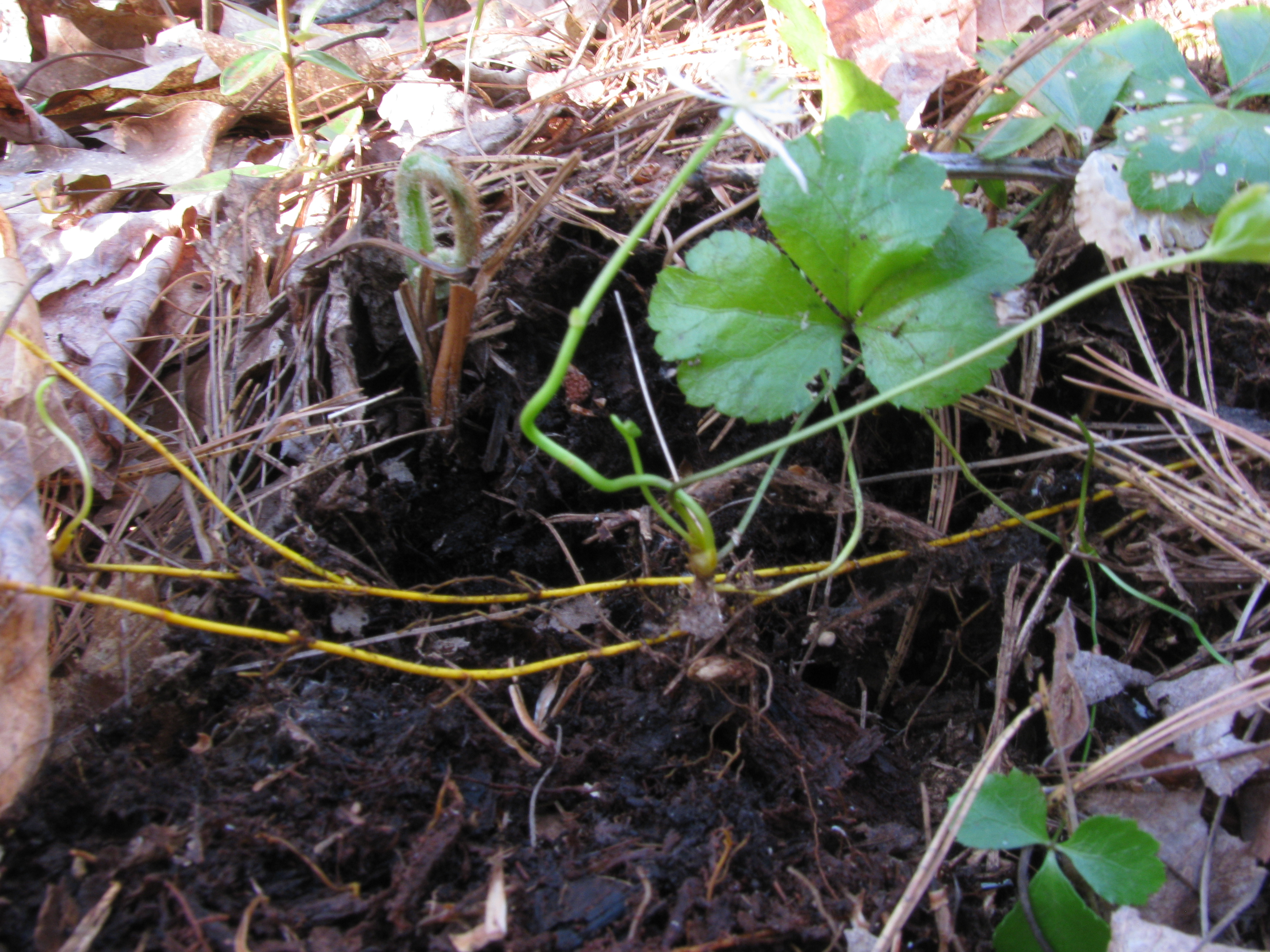
Note the golden-yellow rhizomes

Coptis trifolia, commonly known as the threeleaf goldthread or savoyane, is a perennial plant in the family Ranunculaceae native to North America. A small perennial forb that spreads by slender, creeping rhizomes that are bright golden-yellow in color, hence the common name goldenthread.

== Description ==
The evergreen leaves, about 2.5 cm (1.0 in) long and wide, are divided into three leaflets and rise from the stems on roughly 7.5 cm (3.0 in) long petioles. Each leaflet is roughly fan-shaped with serrate margins. The leaf surface is shiny and dark green in color.

Solitary flowers, about 1.3 cm (0.5 in) wide, are born from the ends of naked stalks which rise 3–17 cm (1.2–6.7 in) above the stem. Each flower has 5–7 white, petal-like sepals which alternate with short, yellow, club-shaped petals. The flowers are bisexual with several bright green styles, curled at the tips, surrounded by 30–60 white-tipped stamens.

The fruits are an array of 4–7 erect follicles. The fruits have a stipe equal to or longer than the body, which is 3.9–7 mm (0.15–0.28 in) in length. They are elliptic in shape with a beak 2–4 mm (0.08–0.16 in) long. The fruits dehisce when mature, releasing several small seeds, 1–1.5 mm (0.04–0.06 in) wide.

The plant blooms between April and July, depending on the latitude, with fruits developing soon after.

== Distribution and habitat ==
It is native to North America and Asia across the subarctic region. Its range is divided into three broad groups. The first is from southern Greenland and Labrador that extends to Manitoba to the west and to the mountains of North Carolina to the south. The second is in Alaska and adjacent areas of British Columbia, extending towards eastern Siberia and into Japan and Manchuria. Records from Norway and central Russia are most likely based on confusion. The disrupted and wide range of the species suggests that the three populations have been isolated from each other for significant periods of time.

C. trifolia can be found in a wide range of wet to mesic environments throughout its range including coniferous and mixed forests, bogs, willow scrub, and tundra. It is often associated with mosses, and where their ranges overlap, Eastern hemlock.

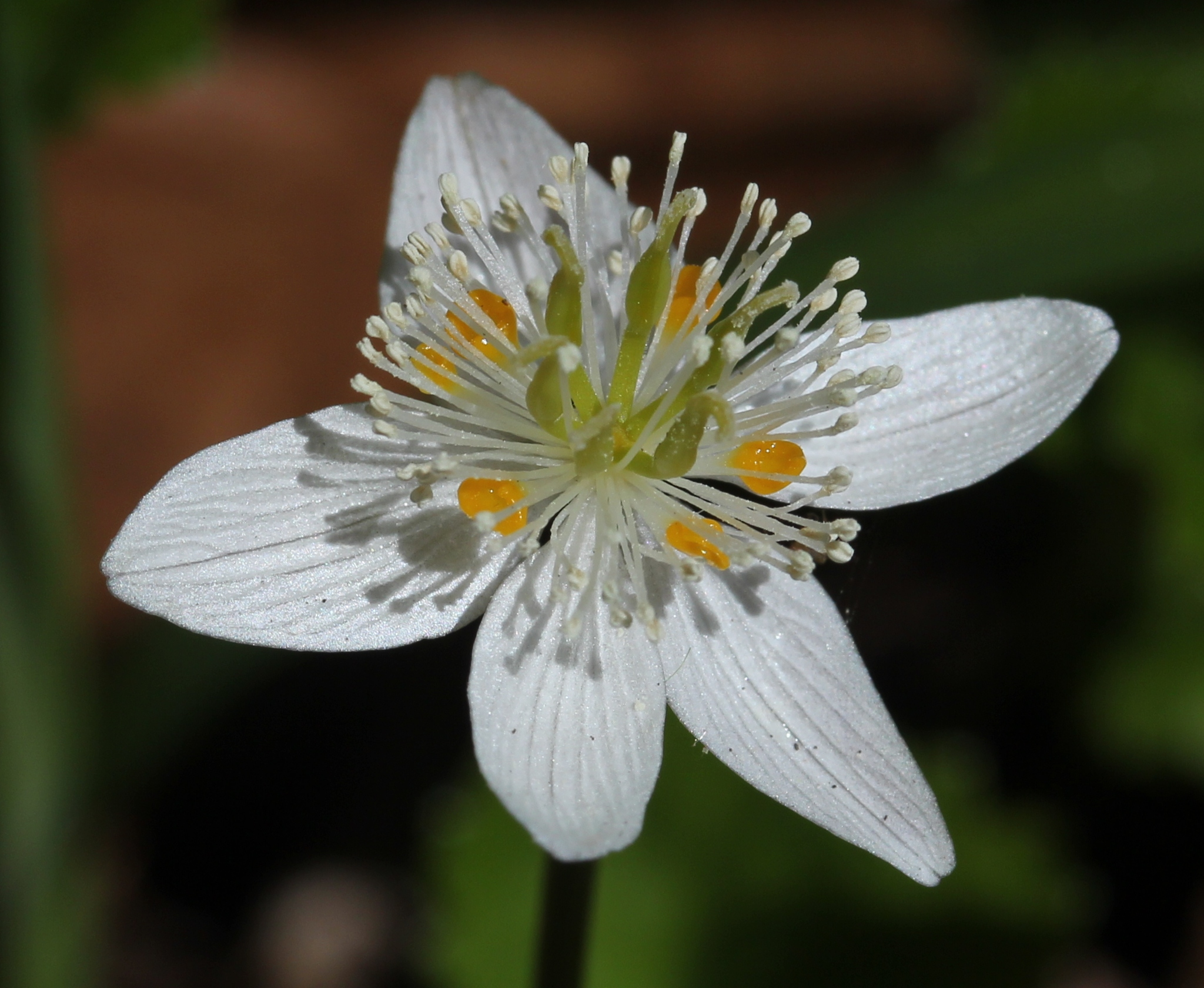
Mature flower

== Medicinal uses ==
The rhizome of the plant was used by several Native American peoples, including many Algonquian peoples and the Haudenosaunee, to relieve canker sores and other ailments of the mouth. This is the source of another common name, canker-root. It has also been used to make a tea that is used as an eyewash, as well as an anthelmintic, antiemetic, emetic, and gastroinestinal aid. Like the medicinal plant goldenseal, goldthread is used to treat symptoms of influenza and the common cold. C. trifolia has been shown to be biologically active against E. coli and Bacillus subtilis. The active compounds of C. trifolia are the alkaloids berberine and coptine.

== Ecology ==
Species of the fungal genus Gloeosporium can infect C. trifolia, as well as other species of Coptis, and reduce normal plant function. The slug Arion fasciatus also feeds on goldthread. In 1963, a species of fungus in the genus Lambertella, Lambertella copticola, was discovered growing on the dead leaves and petioles of C. trifolia.

C. trifolia is not tolerant of disturbance and often does not recover from logging, either due to loss of the canopy or mechanical damage to the root system. The species is also not well adapted to fire due to its shallow roots, occurring in areas that tend to have long fire rotations of up 500 years. Because of its sensitivity to disturbance, C. trifolia is particularly vulnerable to the impacts of human development and recreation.

== Gallery ==
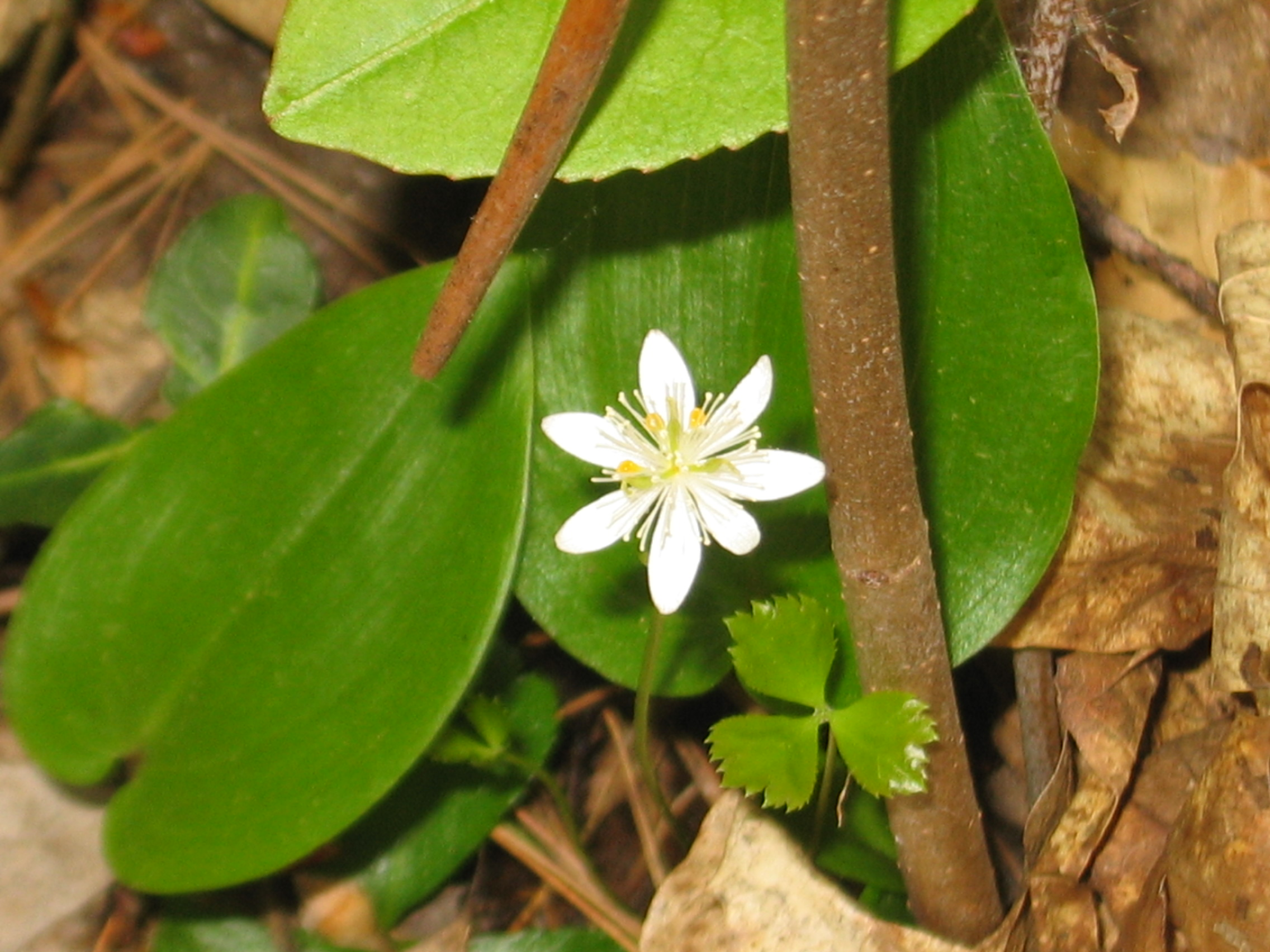

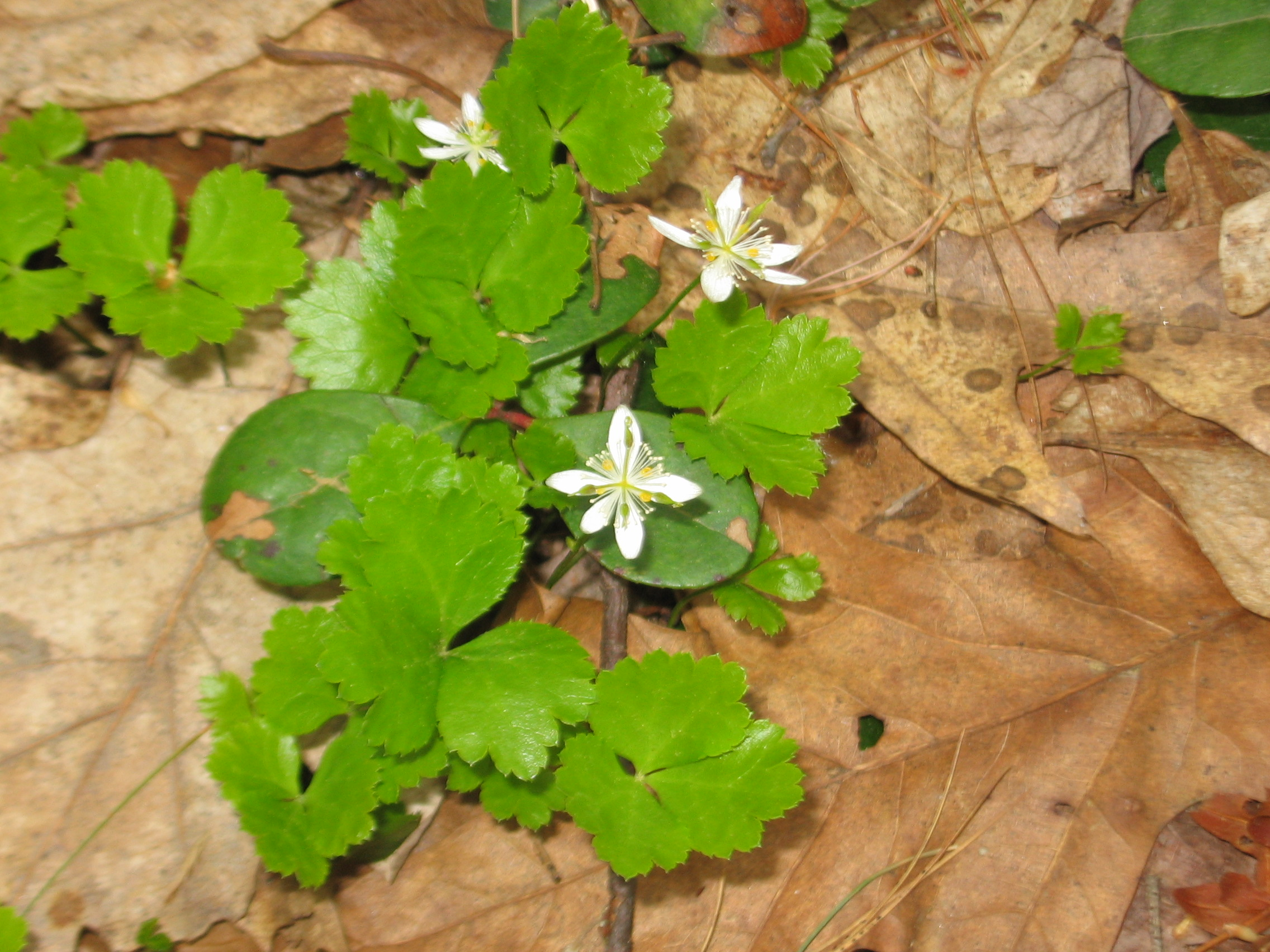

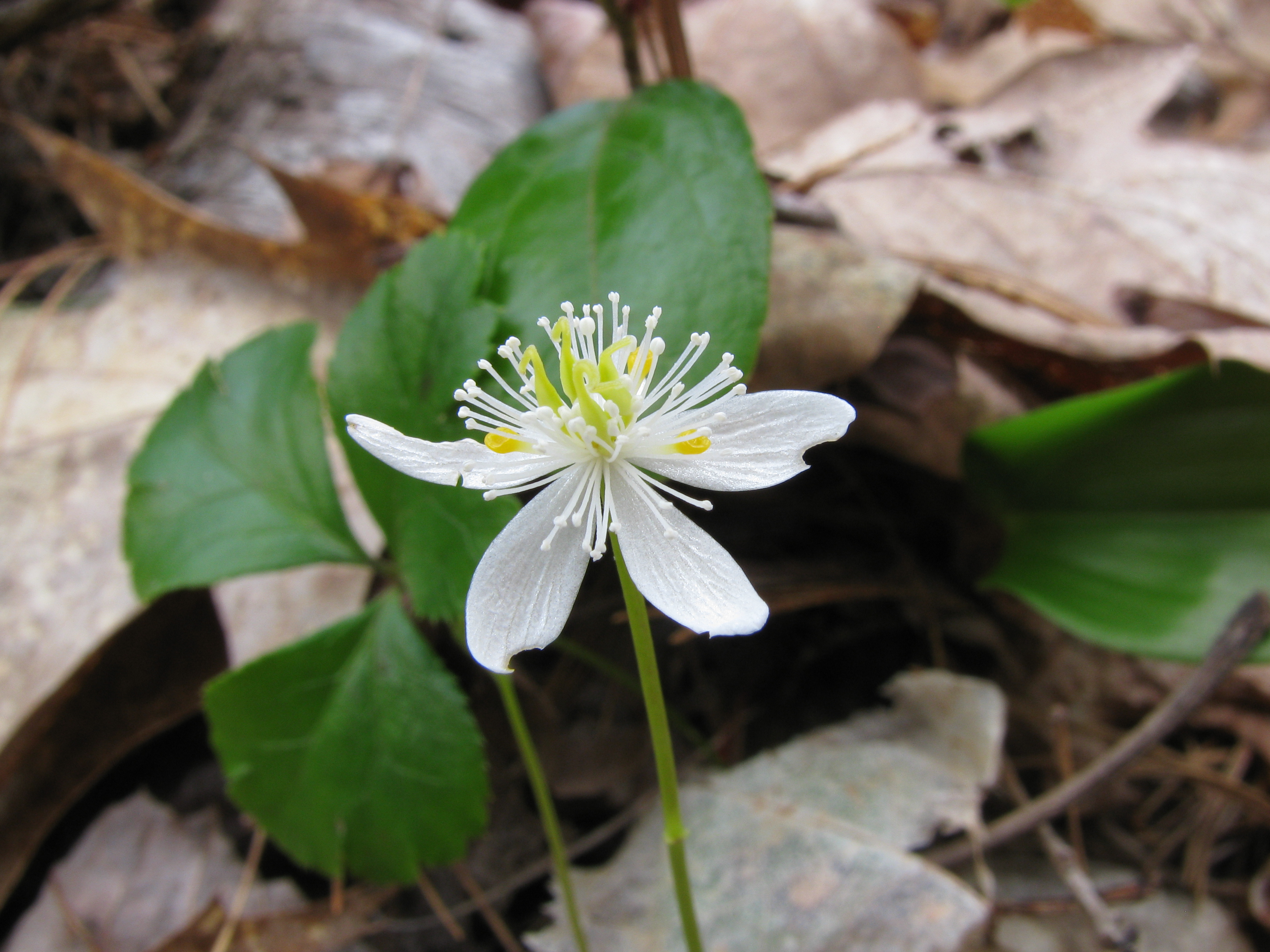
Blossom

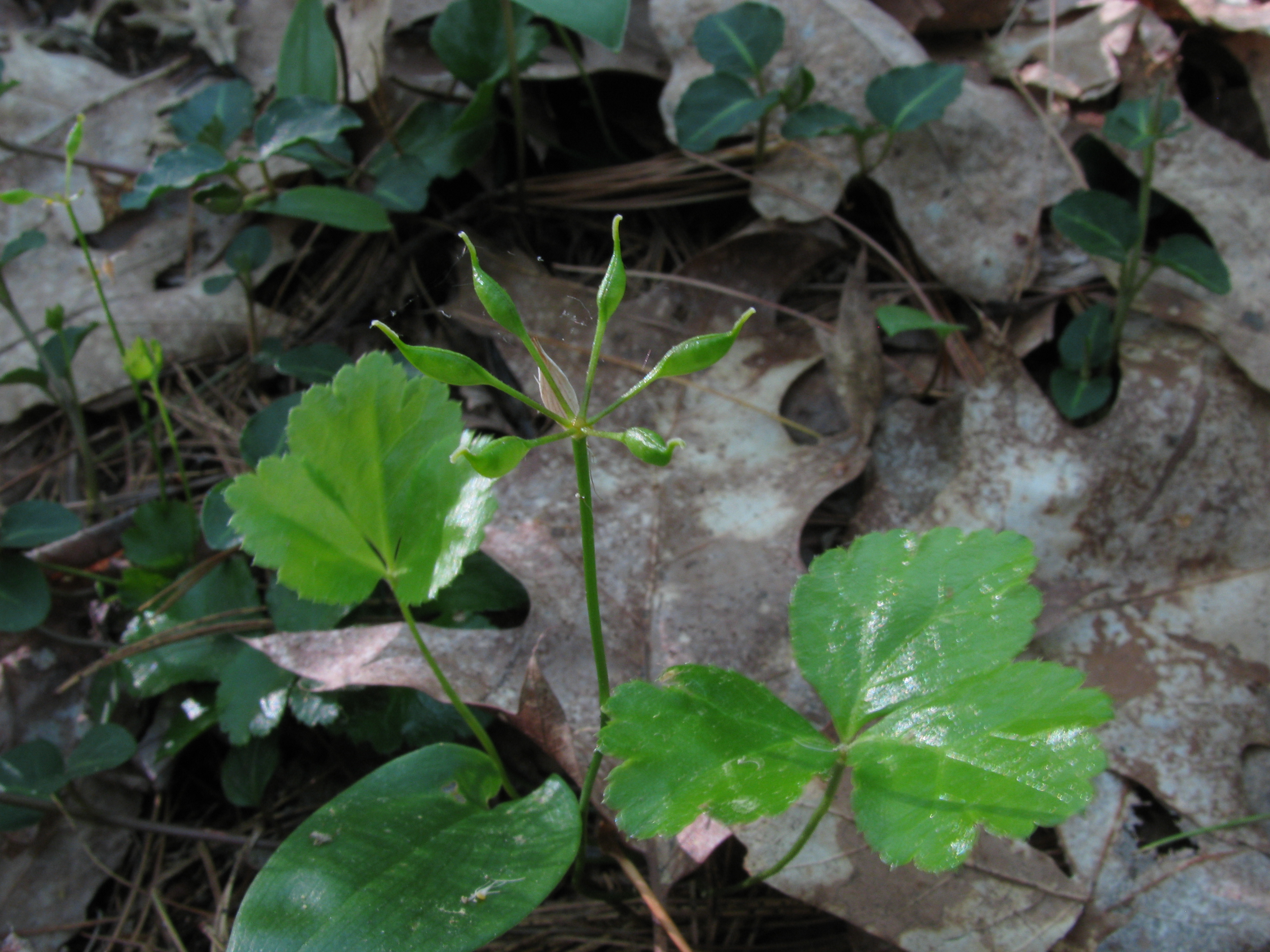
Foliage and seed pods
