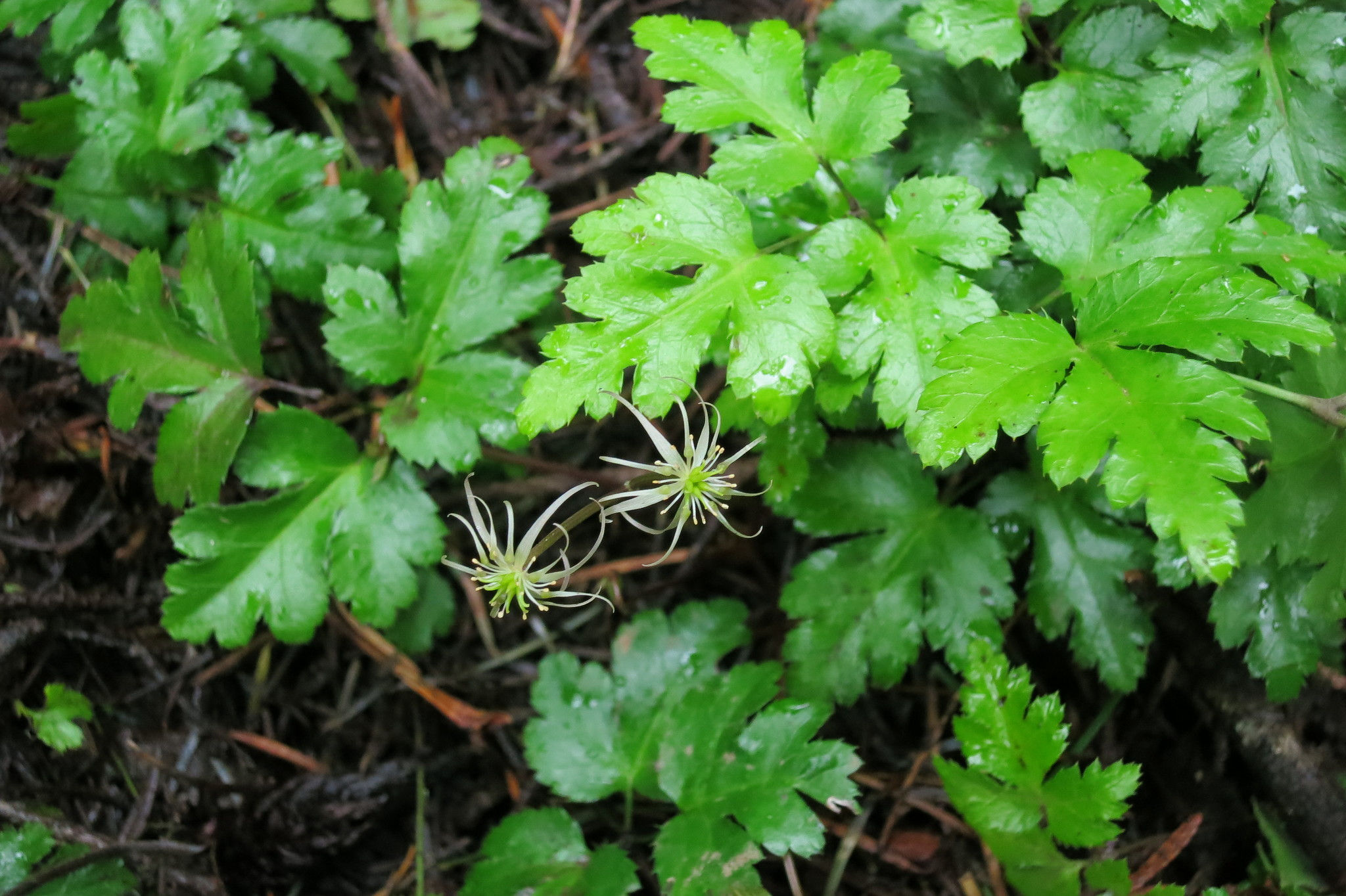

Scientific classification
- Kingdom: Plantae
- Clade: Tracheophytes
- Clade: Angiosperms
- Clade: Eudicots
- Order: Ranunculales
- Family: Ranunculaceae
- Genus: Coptis
- Species: C. laciniata

Binomial name
- Coptis laciniata A.Gray

= Coptis laciniata =

Species of flowering plant

Coptis laciniata is a species of flowering plant in the buttercup family known by the common name Oregon goldthread. It is native to Washington, Oregon, and northern California on the west coast of the United States, where it grows in wet habitat in the understory of mountain and coastal coniferous forests. It is a small perennial herb creeping on a yellow stolon through other vegetation and leaf litter. There are a few leaves on its short stem which are divided into leaflets subdivided into several toothed lobes. The stemlike inflorescence arises up to 19 centimeters tall from the stem at ground level. Each flower is an array of thin, threadlike petals. Six to 12 fruits arise on short stalks, arranged in a ring. The fruits are shiny, hairless follicles, each roughly a centimeter long.
