= Magnoflorine =

Names
- IUPAC name 1,11-Dihydroxy-2,10-dimethoxy-6-methylaporphin-6-ium
- Systematic IUPAC name (6aS)-1,11-Dihydroxy-2,10-dimethoxy-6,6-dimethyl-5,6,6a,7-tetrahydro-4H-dibenzo[de,g]quinolin-6-ium
- Other names Magnoflorine; Thalictrin; Escholin; Escholine; Thalictrine

Identifiers
CAS Number	2141-09-5
3D model (JSmol)	Interactive image
ChEBI	CHEBI:6641
ChemSpider	66066
ECHA InfoCard	100.208.671
KEGG	C09581
PubChem CID	73337
UNII	NI8K6962K4
CompTox Dashboard (EPA)	DTXSID90943972
- InChI: InChI=1S/C20H23NO4/c1-21(2)8-7-12-10-15(25-4)20(23)18-16(12)13(21)9-11-5-6-14(24-3)19(22)17(11)18/h5-6,10,13H,7-9H2,1-4H3,(H-,22,23)/p+1/t13-/m0/s1 Key: YLRXAIKMLINXQY-ZDUSSCGKSA-O
- SMILES: C[N+]1(CCC2=CC(=C(C3=C2[C@@H]1CC4=C3C(=C(C=C4)OC)O)O)OC)C

Properties
Chemical formula	C_{20}H_{24}NO_{4}+
Molar mass	342.41 g/mol
- Except where otherwise noted, data are given for materials in their standard state (at 25 °C [77 °F], 100 kPa). Infobox references

(S)-Magnoflorine is a quaternary benzylisoquinoline alkaloid (BIA) of the aporphine structural subgroup which has been isolated from various species of the family Menispermaceae, such as Pachygone ovata, Sinomenium acutum, and Cissampelos pareira.

It was identified among the verified anti-inflammatory components in an extract of Sinomenii caulis and has been proposed to have other potential physiological effects, such as sedative and anxiolytic, reduction of erythrocyte hemolysis, antifungal activity, improvement of LPS-induced acute lung injury, and protection against muscle atrophy. Furthermore, magnoflorine has been identified to be an inhibitor of NF-κB activation and to be an agonist at the β_{2} -adrenergic receptor.

(S)-Magnoflorine is metabolically derived from (S)-reticuline, a pivotal intermediate in the biosynthesis of numerous BIA structural subgroups, through two enzymatic steps: first, (S)-corytuberine synthase/CYP80G2 to (S)-corytuberine, and secondly, (S)-corytuberine-N-methyltransferase to (S)-magnoflorine.
