= Mountain alder =

Mountain alder is a common name for two different alders:

- Alnus alnobetula subsp. crispa — the green alder, native to western North America.
- Alnus incana subsp. tenuifolia — the grey alder or thinleaf alder, native to western North America.
