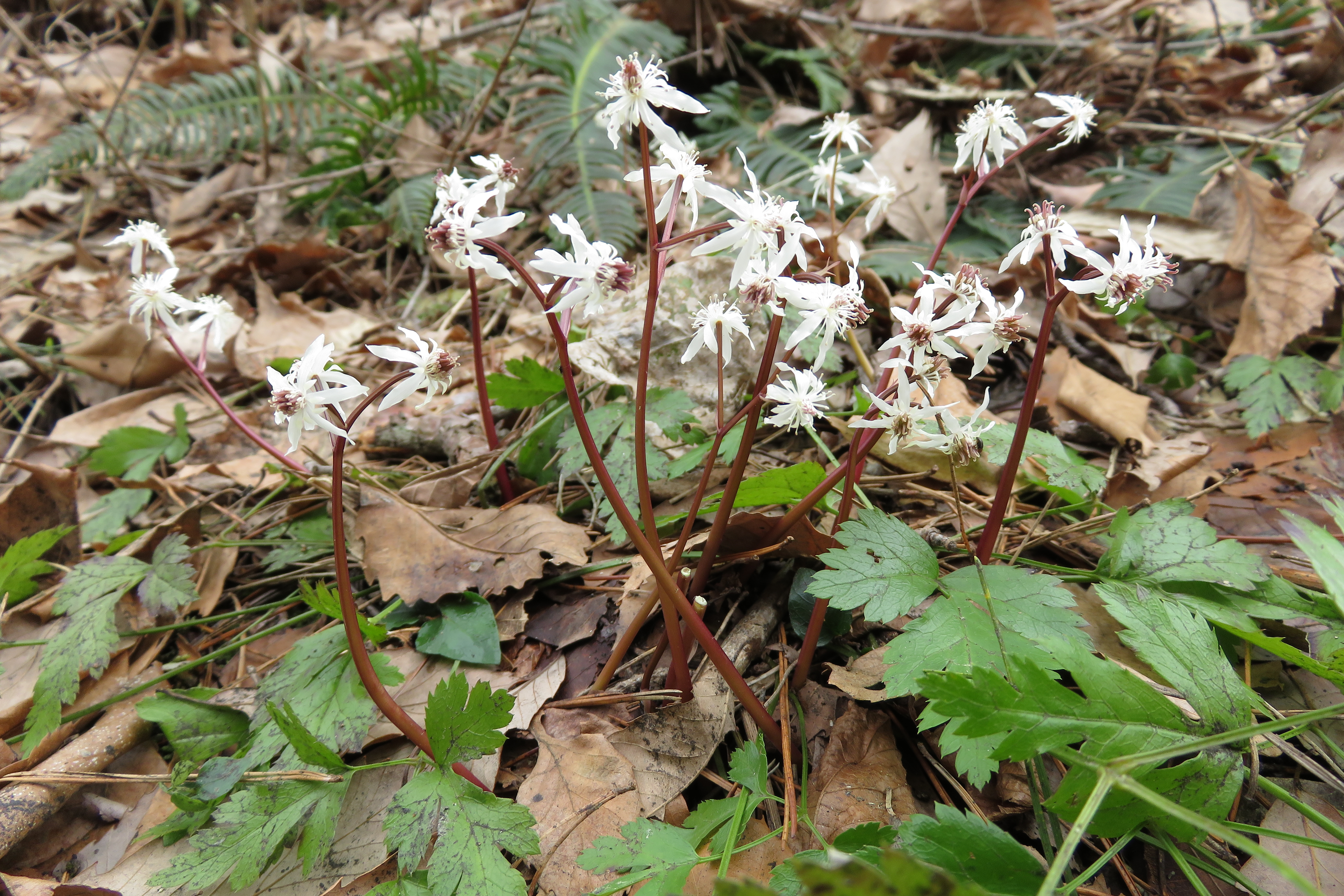
- In bloom
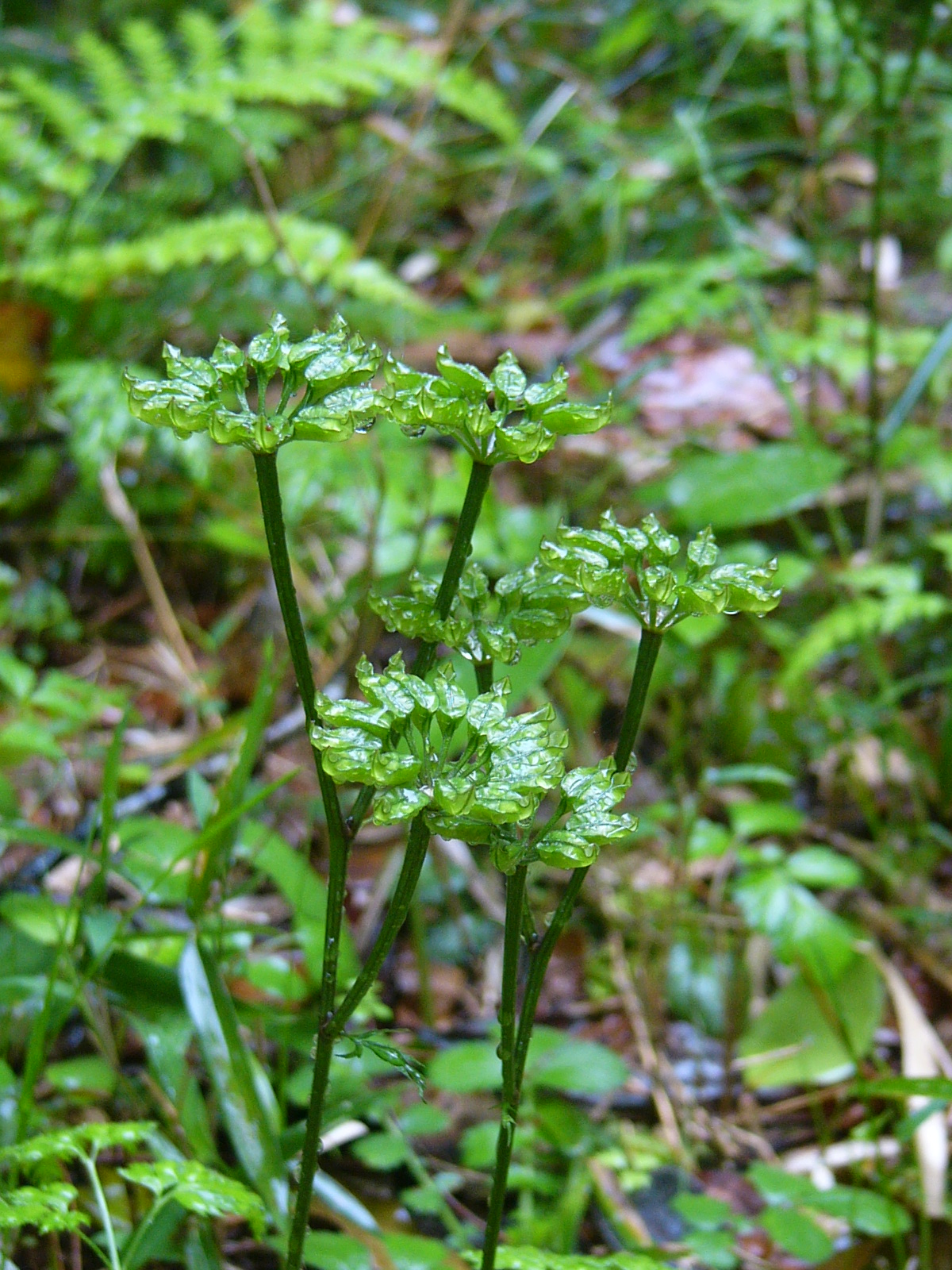
- Fruit

Scientific classification
- Kingdom: Plantae
- Clade: Embryophytes
- Clade: Tracheophytes
- Clade: Spermatophytes
- Clade: Angiosperms
- Clade: Eudicots
- Order: Ranunculales
- Family: Ranunculaceae
- Genus: Coptis
- Species: C. japonica

Binomial name
- Coptis japonica (Thunb.) Makino

Synonyms
- List: Coptis anemonifolia Siebold & Zucc.; Coptis brachypetala Siebold & Zucc.; Coptis japonica var. anemonifolia (Siebold & Zucc.) H.Ohba; Coptis japonica f. viridiflora Honda ex Kadota; Coptis orientalis Maxim.; Thalictrum japonicum Thunb.

= Coptis japonica =

Species of flowering plant

Coptis japonica, the Japanese goldthread, is a species of flowering plant in the family Ranunculaceae, native to central and southern Japan, and introduced to Korea. In Asia it is grown for medicinal purposes, with the main alkaloid being berberine.

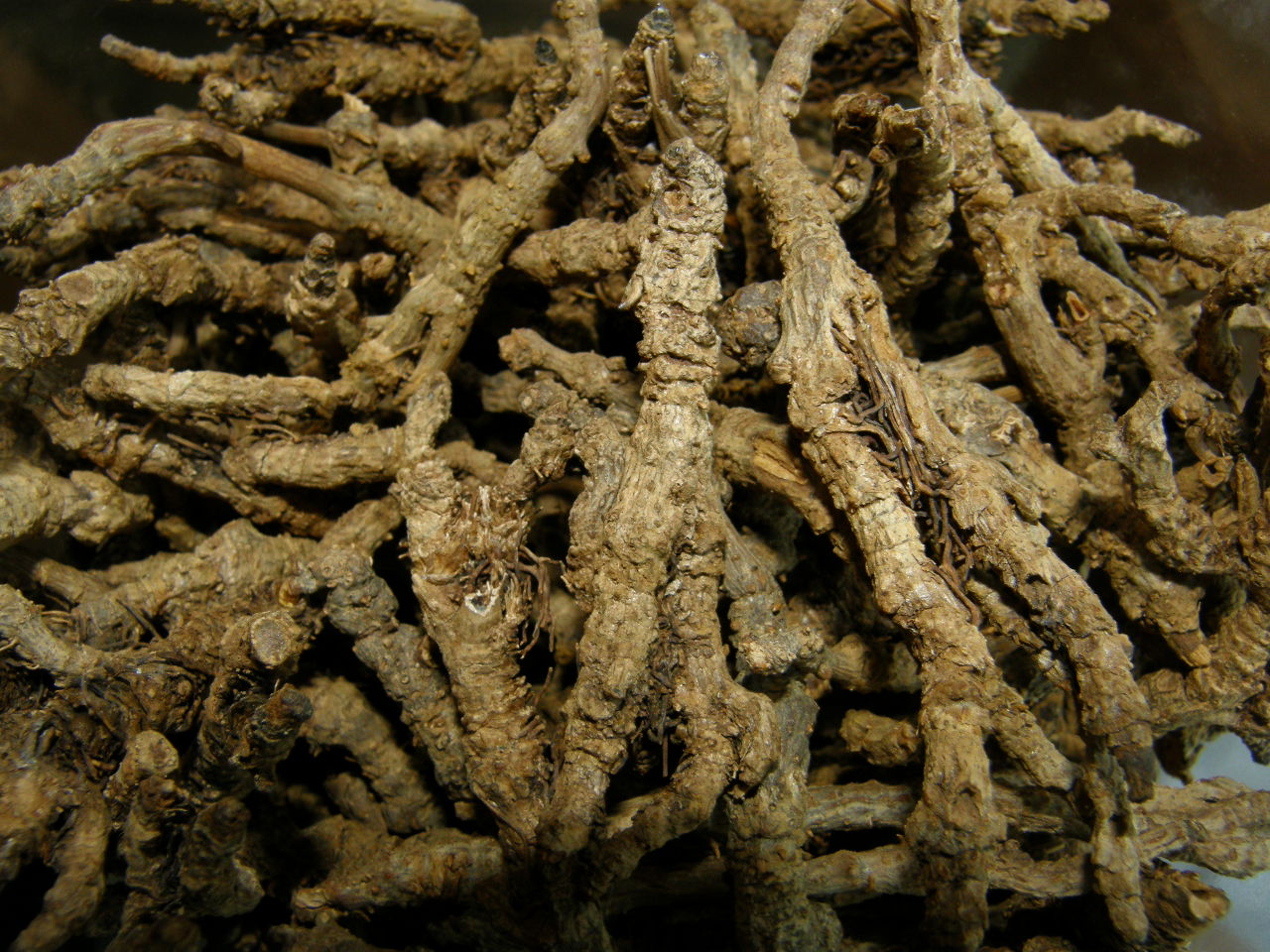
Rhizomes partly prepared for herbal medicines
