= Mountain heather =

Mountain heather is a common name for several plants in the heather family (Ericaceae) and may refer to:

- Cassiope
- Phyllodoce

== See also ==
- Heather Mountain, mountain in Oregon, United States of America
