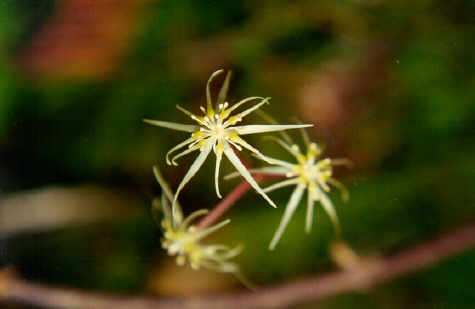
- Coptis occidentalis flowers

Scientific classification
- Kingdom: Plantae
- Clade: Tracheophytes
- Clade: Angiosperms
- Clade: Eudicots
- Order: Ranunculales
- Family: Ranunculaceae
- Subfamily: Coptidoideae
- Genus: Coptis; Salisb.

Type species
- Coptis trifolia

Species
- See text

= Coptis =

Genus of flowering plants

Coptis (goldthread or canker root) is a genus of between 10 and 15 species of flowering plants in the family Ranunculaceae, native to Asia and North America.

== Species ==
Image	Scientific name	Common name	Distribution
	Coptis aspleniifolia Salisb.	fernleaf goldthread, spleenwort-leaf goldthread	British Columbia, in Alaska, and along the Cascades into Washington
	Coptis chinensis Franch.	Chinese goldthread	China.
	Coptis deltoidea C.Y.Cheng & P.K.Hsiao		China (W. Sichuan)
	Coptis huanjiangensis L.Q.Huang, Q.J.Yuan & Y.H.Wang		China (Guangxi)
	Coptis japonica (Thunb.) Makino	Japanese goldthread	Japan
	Coptis kitayamensis Kadota		Japan (Honshu)
	Coptis laciniata A.Gray	Oregon goldthread	California, Oregon, Washington State
	Coptis lutescens Tamura		Japan (C. Honshu)
	Coptis minamitaniana Kadota		Japan (Kyushu)
	Coptis occidentalis (Nutt.) Torr. & A.Gray	Idaho goldthread	Idaho, Montana, Washington
	Coptis omeiensis (F.H.Chen) C.Y.Cheng		China (W. Sichuan, Henan)
	Coptis quinquefolia Miq.		Taiwan, Japan
	Coptis quinquesecta W.T.Wang		Yunnan, China and northern Vietnam.
	Coptis ramosa (Makino) Tamura		Japan
	Coptis teeta Wall.	Yunnan goldthread	Arunachal Pradesh to China (NW. Yunnan)
	Coptis trifolia (L.) Salisb.	threeleaf goldthread, savoyane, canker-root	Eastern Eurasia, Greenland, Saint Pierre and Miquelon, Canada, USA
	Coptis trifoliolata (Makino) Makino		Japan (N. & Central Honshu)

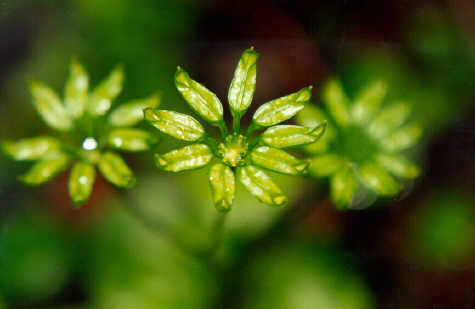
Coptis occidentalis fruit

== Uses ==
Coptis teeta is used as a medicinal herb in China and the Eastern Himalayan regions of India particularly in Mishmi Hills of Arunachal Pradesh where it is used as a bitter tonic for treating malarial fever and dyspepsia. It is also believed to help insomnia in Chinese herbology. The roots contain the bitter alkaloid berberine. Studies have shown that the species has become endangered both due to overexploitation as well as intrinsic genetic bottlenecks such as high cytoplasmic male sterility induced by genetic mutations. As a result of the synaptic mutation and ensuing male sterility, the sexual reproduction in the species is significantly depressed. The dried roots (goldthread) were commercially marketed in Canada until the 1950s or early 60s, to be steeped into a "tea" and swabbed onto areas affected by thrush (candidiasis) infection.

== Ecology ==
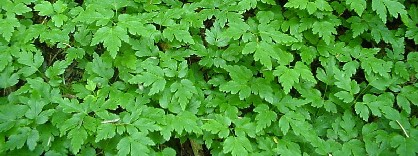
Coptis aspleniifolia leaves

The species inhabits warm and cold temperate forests of oak-rhododendron association. It is occasionally seen growing under bamboo thickets around Mayodia region of Dibang Valley district in the Mishmi Hills of Arunachal Pradesh in India. It flowers during early spring March–April and sets fruit/seed in July–August. The seedlings are rare and are often found germinating on moss laden dead wood on the forest floor or even on moss laden branches of Rhododendron. A new subspecies was recognised in C. teeta by Pandit & Babu and was named as subsp. lohitensis, which is morphologically very different from subsp. teeta and it is geographically distinct and inhabits broad leaf forests in Delai Valley of Lohit district in Arunachal Pradesh, India.
