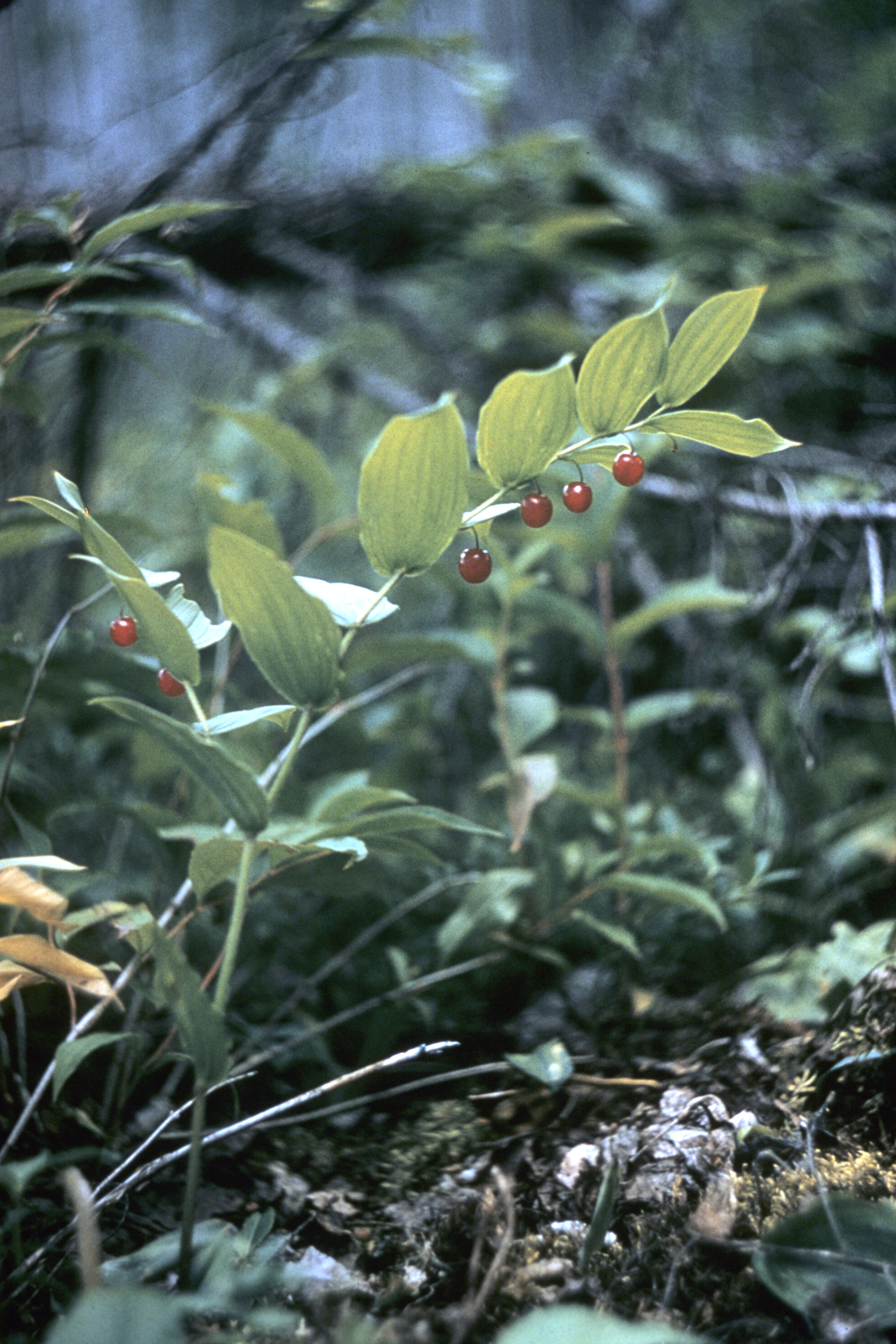

Conservation status
- Secure (NatureServe)

Scientific classification
- Kingdom: Plantae
- Clade: Tracheophytes
- Clade: Angiosperms
- Clade: Monocots
- Order: Liliales
- Family: Liliaceae
- Genus: Streptopus
- Species: S. lanceolatus

Binomial name
- Streptopus lanceolatus (Aiton) Reveal

Synonyms
- Hekorima atropurpurea Fisch. ex Regel & Tiling; Hekorima dichotoma Kunth; Hexorima dichotoma Raf.; Streptopus curvipes Vail; Streptopus lanceolatus var. curvipes (Vail) Reveal; Streptopus lanceolatus var. longipes (Fernald) Reveal; Streptopus lanceolatus var. roseus (Michx.) Reveal; Streptopus longipes Fernald; Streptopus roseus Michx.; Streptopus roseus var. curvipes (Vail) Fassett; Streptopus roseus subsp. curvipes (Vail) Hultén; Streptopus roseus f. giganteus Fassett; Streptopus roseus f. indivisus Lepage; Streptopus roseus var. longipes (Fernald) Fassett; Streptopus roseus subsp. longipes (Fernald) Á.Löve & D.Löve; Streptopus roseus subsp. perspectus (Fassett) Á.Löve & D.Löve; Streptopus roseus var. perspectus Fassett; Streptopus roseus f. simplex Vict.; Uvularia lanceolata Aiton; Uvularia rosea (Michx.) Pers.

= Streptopus lanceolatus =

Species of flowering plant

Streptopus lanceolatus (rose twisted stalk, rosybells, rose mandarin, scootberry, liverberry, rose-bellwort), is an understory perennial plant native to the forests of North America, from Alaska to Labrador, south through the Great Lakes and Appalachian Mountain regions of the United States, as well as Montana, Washington state, Oregon, and Saint Pierre and Miquelon. It grows primarily in mixed-wood forests, and throughout a wide range of soil and site conditions, preferring cool, acidic soils.

Streptopus lanceolatus grows from a rhizome or seed, the stem having a zigzag shape, branched or sometimes unbranched. Up to 30 cm (12 in) tall with alternate wide lanced oval-shaped leaves with pointed tips and a rounded base, without leaf-stalks. The leaves are often finely toothed having fine hairs on the underside veins. Flowers appear as solitary individuals opposite each leaf in early summer (May to July) and are bell-shaped on 1–3 cm (0.4–1.2 in) long stalks bent midway, with 6 rose or white recurved petals with purple streaks. Fruit is an elongated red berry ripening in mid-summer (July to August). If berries are consumed in quantity, diarrhea can result.

Streptopus lanceolatus can be distinguished from Solomon's seal and false Solomon's seal by the alternate leaves on a zigzag stem.

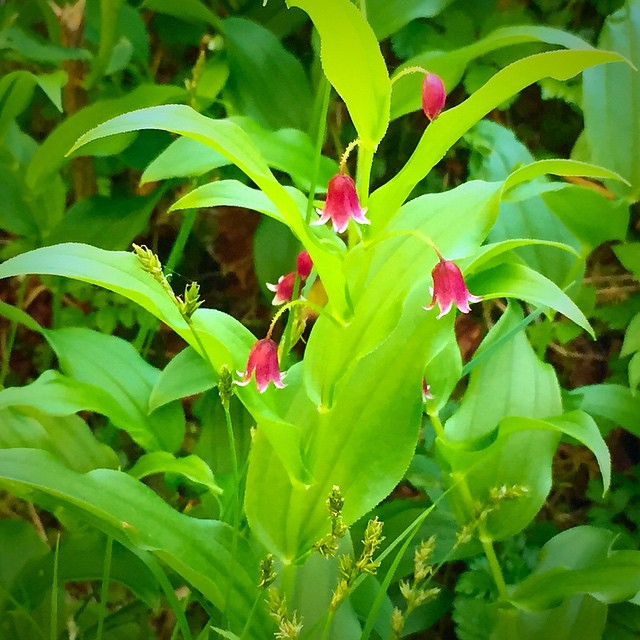
Streptopus lanceolatus in bloom, picture taken on Dude Mountain Trail in Alaska
