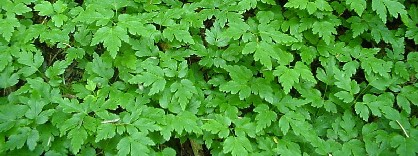

Scientific classification
- Kingdom: Plantae
- Clade: Tracheophytes
- Clade: Angiosperms
- Clade: Eudicots
- Order: Ranunculales
- Family: Ranunculaceae
- Genus: Coptis
- Species: C. aspleniifolia

Binomial name
- Coptis aspleniifolia Salisb.

= Coptis aspleniifolia =

Species of flowering plant

Coptis aspleniifolia, commonly known as fernleaf goldthread or spleenwort-leaf goldthread, is found in the northern two-thirds of British Columbia, in Alaska, and along the Cascades into Washington and is a native plant of the temperate rain forests of the region. It is often found in the understory of the herb layer of coniferous forests as part of a multilayered canopy system on gleysolic or organic soils. Also found in wet woods and bogs, the fernleaf goldthread is not invasive or poisonous. The plant is considered common and widespread in its native range.

An evergreen perennial, the fernleaf goldthread is mostly hairless and five to 30 centimeters in height. Its leaves resemble those of ferns, are all basal, dark-green and glossy and divided into five or more segments. The fernleaf goldthread blooms in mid-spring with a pale greenish white or yellow flower. It has two or three nodding flowers per stalk, each with five to seven sepals and five to seven thin petals. The fernleaf goldthread is a member of the buttercup family.

The plant gets its common name from its leaves which are structured similar to the common fern and for its roots, which are vibrant golden hue when peeled. It plays several roles in the ecosystem, serving as a protective ground cover, keeping moisture in the ground by providing shade, and providing a food source for deer.
