= Codeine 3-O-demethylase =

Enzyme

Identifiers
- EC no.: 1.14.11.32

Databases
- IntEnz: IntEnz view
- BRENDA: BRENDA entry
- ExPASy: NiceZyme view
- KEGG: KEGG entry
- MetaCyc: metabolic pathway
- PRIAM: profile
- PDB structures: RCSB PDB PDBe PDBsum
Search
- PMC: articles
- PubMed: articles
- NCBI: proteins

Codeine 3-O-demethylase (EC 1.14.11.32, codeine O-demethylase, CODM) is an enzyme with systematic name codeine,2-oxoglutarate:oxygen oxidoreductase (3-O-demethylating). It catalyses two of the chemical reactions involved in the pathway to morphine from thebaine. One goes via oripavine and the other via codeine. Both involve the removal of a phenolic methyl group (OCH_{3}) using molecular oxygen as oxidant.

codeine + α-ketoglutaric acid + O_{2} $\rightleftharpoons$ morphine + formaldehyde + succinic acid + CO_{2}

This is the reaction from which the enzyme gets its name. However, it also acts on thebaine:

thebaine + α-ketoglutaric acid + O_{2} $\rightleftharpoons$ oripavine + formaldehyde + succinic acid + CO_{2}

== Conversion of thebaine to oripavine ==
In this part of the biosynthesis of morphine in the opium poppy Papaver somniferum, the substrate of the enzyme is thebaine and the alkaloid product is oripavine:

thebaine
Fe(IV)=O
Fe(II)
oripavine
+ H_{2}C=O

In this sequence, codeine 3-O-demethylase is responsible for removal of the methyl substituent of the methoxy group attached to the phenyl ring, which is converted to formaldehyde, with the oxidation driven by molecular oxygen. This route to morphine is completed via morphinone. The enzyme is a non-heme iron protein with ferryl active site where Fe(IV)=O is the species that transfers its oxygen to the substrate.

The mechanism used by these 2-oxoglutarate-dependent oxygenases requires 2-oxoglutaric acid to activate the iron oxygen complex, and this gives succinic acid and carbon dioxide when the second atom of the molecular oxygen is removed.

2-oxoglutaric acid
[O]
CO_{2}
succinic acid

== Conversion of codeine to morphine ==
In the alternative pathway to morphine in which thebaine is first demethylated at its enol ether by the enzyme thebaine 6-O-demethylase giving neopinone and subsequently codeinone and codeine, the final step again involves codeine 3-O-demethylase:

codeine
Fe(IV)=O
Fe(II)
morphine
+ H_{2}C=O

Codeine 3-O-demethylase and thebaine 6-O-demethylase are both α-ketoglutarate/Fe(II)-dependent dioxygenases and as of 2024 were the only enzymes confirmed to use this combination for demethylation.
