= Papaver somniferum × bracteatum =

Scientific classification
- Kingdom: Plantae
- Clade: Embryophytes
- Clade: Tracheophytes
- Clade: Angiosperms
- Clade: Eudicots
- Order: Ranunculales
- Family: Papaveraceae
- Tribe: Papavereae
- Genus: Papaver
- Species: P. somniferum × P. bracteatum

Hybrid poppy

Papaver somniferum × Papaver bracteatum, also known as Sagan's poppy, is a hybrid between the opium poppy and the Iranian poppy.

This hybrid, true poppy is diploid with 18 chromosomes and exhibits strongly reduced fitness relative to parents, possibly due to unpaired chromosomes since the Iranian and opium poppies do not have the same number. The clearest example of its reduced fitness is seen through semilethal dwarfism, with about 53.4% of specimens grown exhibiting dwarfism. While this hybrid does not possess the cold hardiness of the Iranian poppy (Papaver bracteatum), it does possess notably more cold tolerance than Papaver somniferum and in a greenhouse or protected setting could be grown as a perennial. Another notable feature of this hybrid is that it contains a higher concentration of morphinian alkaloids (including morphine) than any known cultivar of Papaver somniferum or Papaver bracteatum. This is despite one of its parents (Papaver bracteatum) producing negligible concentrations of morphine and is believed to be due to a greater expression of one of the rate-limiting enzymes of morphine synthesis.
