= 6,14-Endoethenotetrahydrooripavine =

Names
- IUPAC name (4R,7S,7aR,12bR)-7-Methoxy-3-methyl-2,3,4,4a,7,7a-hexahydro-1H-4al5-4a,7-ethano-4,12-methanobenzofuro[3,2-e]isoquinolin-9-ol

Identifiers
3D model (JSmol)	Interactive image
PubChem CID	59866315
- InChI: InChI=1S/C20H23NO3/c1-21-10-9-20-15-12-3-4-13(22)16(15)24-17(20)19(23-2)7-5-18(20,6-8-19)14(21)11-12/h3-5,7,14,17,22H,6,8-11H2,1-2H3/t14-,17+,18?,19-,20+/m1/s1
- SMILES: [H][C@]12OC3=C4C(C[C@H]5N(C)CC[C@@]14[C@@]51CC[C@]2(OC)C=C1)=CC=C3O

Properties
Chemical formula	C_{20}H_{23}NO_{3}
Molar mass	325.408 g·mol^{−1}
- Except where otherwise noted, data are given for materials in their standard state (at 25 °C [77 °F], 100 kPa). Infobox references

6,14-Endoethenotetrahydrooripavine is the central nucleus, or backbone, of a class of morphinan opioids known as the Bentley compounds and may be considered their "privileged scaffold". These include but are not limited to etorphine and buprenorphine. They usually have thebaine or oripavine as their precursor in their syntheses (and are thus termed "thevinols" and "orvinols", respectively).

== See also ==
- Bridged oripavine derivatives
- Acetorphine
- Thienorphine
