= Cyprenorphine =

Chemical compound

Clinical data
- ATC code: none

Legal status
- Legal status: US: Schedule I

Identifiers
- IUPAC name: 6,7,8,14-tetrahydro- N-(Cyclopropylmethyl)- 7α-(1-hydroxy-1-methylethyl)- 6,14-endo-ethenonororipavine
- CAS Number: 4406-22-8
- PubChem CID: 544534
- ChemSpider: 16735758
- UNII: 1P6HEG5ZHS
- ChEMBL: ChEMBL2106063
- CompTox Dashboard (EPA): DTXSID80905125

Chemical and physical data
- Formula: C_{26}H_{33}NO_{4}
- Molar mass: 423.553 g·mol^{−1}
- 3D model (JSmol): Interactive image
- SMILES: CC(C)(O)[C@H]7C[C@]53/C=C/[C@]7(OC)[C@@H]1Oc6c2c(C[C@H]5N(CC[C@@]123)CC4CC4)ccc6O
- InChI: InChI=1S/C26H33NO4/c1-23(2,29)18-13-24-8-9-26(18,30-3)22-25(24)10-11-27(14-15-4-5-15)19(24)12-16-6-7-17(28)21(31-22)20(16)25/h6-9,15,18-19,22,28-29H,4-5,10-14H2,1-3H3/t18-,19-,22-,24-,25+,26-/m1/s1; Key:VSKIOMHXEUHYSI-KNLIIKEYSA-N

Cyprenorphine (M285), N-cyclo-propylmethyl-6,14-endoetheno-7α-(1-hydroxy-1-methylethyl)-6,7,8,14-tetrahydronororipavine, is an opioid drug. It is related to more well-known opioids such as buprenorphine, which is used as an analgesic and for the treatment of opioid addiction, and diprenorphine, which is used as an antidote to reverse the effects of other opioids. It is roughly 35 times as strong as nalorphine.

Cyprenorphine is a powerful antagonist of opioid receptors and a highly potent specific antagonist. It blocks the binding of morphine and etorphine to these receptors.

Cyprenorphine has mixed agonist–antagonist effects at opioid receptors, like those of buprenorphine. However the effects of cyprenorphine are somewhat different, as it produces pronounced dysphoric and hallucinogenic effects which limit its potential use as an analgesic.

Cyprenorphine also has been shown to suppress the intake of sweet solution but doesn't suppress the increase in food consumption that is produced by the alpha-2-adrenoceptor antagonist idazoxan. Idazoxan may lead to the release of endogenous opioid peptides and increase food intake, this effect is attenuated by (-)-naloxone but not by the mu/delta-antagonist cyprenorphine.

== Medical uses ==
Cyprenorphine increases locomotor activity. It is normally used to reverse the clinically immobilizing effects of etorphine. These effects are reversed rapidly and almost entirely. Etorphine is a chemical relative of morphine, with similar analgesic characteristics but fewer side effects. For instance, in order to handle polar bears and other large animals, they are immobilized using etorphine and the effects of etorphine reversed as soon as handling is complete using cyprenorphine. Etorphine and cyprenorphine come as white powders in a package and cannot be purchased separately. Both are administered by injection after dissolving in saline. Because etorphine is used to immobilize large, still moving, animals, it is often administered intramuscularly using a dart whereas cyprenorphine can be administered intravenously in the femoral vein of the immobile animal. Unlike other antagonists, used to reverse the effects of etorphine, the dose of cyprenorphine administered depends on the initial dose of etorphine instead of the weight of the animal. The recommended dose of cyprenorphine is three times that of the initial etorphine administered. Although the effects of cyprenorphine typically take from 40 to 60 seconds to kick in, it has been observed to take up to 3 hours in white rhinoceroses.

== Adverse effects ==
Cyprenorphine induces depression over an hour in rats. It has also been found to induce psychotomimetic actions in humans and dysphoria when used as a post-operative analgesic in patients. Because of these side effects, it is seldom used in humans, with diprenorphine preferred instead.

== Mechanism of action ==
Although it is still unclear how cyprenorphine antagonizes the effects of etorphine, it has been suggested that its greater potency may enable it to displace etorphine in mutual binding sites in the brain. 16-methyl Cyprenorphine, an isoform of Cyprenorphine is an antagonist of the delta, mu and kappa opioid receptors. Its elimination rate constants (Ke) at these receptors are 0.68, 0.076 and 0.79 nM respectively.
