= Thebaine 6-O-demethylase =

Identifiers
- EC no.: 1.14.11.31

Databases
- IntEnz: IntEnz view
- BRENDA: BRENDA entry
- ExPASy: NiceZyme view
- KEGG: KEGG entry
- MetaCyc: metabolic pathway
- PRIAM: profile
- PDB structures: RCSB PDB PDBe PDBsum
Search
- PMC: articles
- PubMed: articles
- NCBI: proteins

Thebaine 6-O-demethylase (EC 1.14.11.31, T6ODM) is an enzyme with systematic name thebaine,2-oxoglutarate:oxygen oxidoreductase (6-O-demethylating). It catalyses the following chemical reaction

thebaine
Fe(IV)=O
Fe(II)
neopinone
+ H_{2}C=O

In the opium poppy Papaver somniferum, this is the first step in one of the two possible pathways to morphine from thebaine. These differ according to which methyl group in thebaine is first to be removed in an oxidation reaction. In this case, it is the one in the C6 position (an enol ether); in the other it is the C3 (phenolic OCH_{3}) which is removed by codeine 3-O-demethylase.

Thebaine 6-O-demethylase is an oxidase which uses molecular oxygen as oxidant, with incorporation of one of its atoms to convert the methyl group which is removed to formaldehyde. The enzyme is a non-heme iron protein with ferryl active site where Fe(IV)=O is the species that transfers its oxygen to the substrate. The mechanism used by these 2-oxoglutarate-dependent oxygenases requires 2-oxoglutaric acid to activate the iron oxygen complex, and this gives succinic acid and carbon dioxide when the second atom of the molecular oxygen is removed.

2-oxoglutaric acid
[O]
CO_{2}
succinic acid

The alkaloid product of the reaction, neopinone, can convert spontaneously to the next intermediate, codeinone, in the pathway to morphine via codeine but this step is catalysed in opium poppy by the enzyme neopinone isomerase (NISO).

neopinone
NISO
codeinone

Thebaine 6-O-demethylase and codeine 3-O-demethylase are both α-ketoglutarate/Fe(II)-dependent dioxygenases and as of 2024 were the only enzymes confirmed to use this combination for demethylation.
