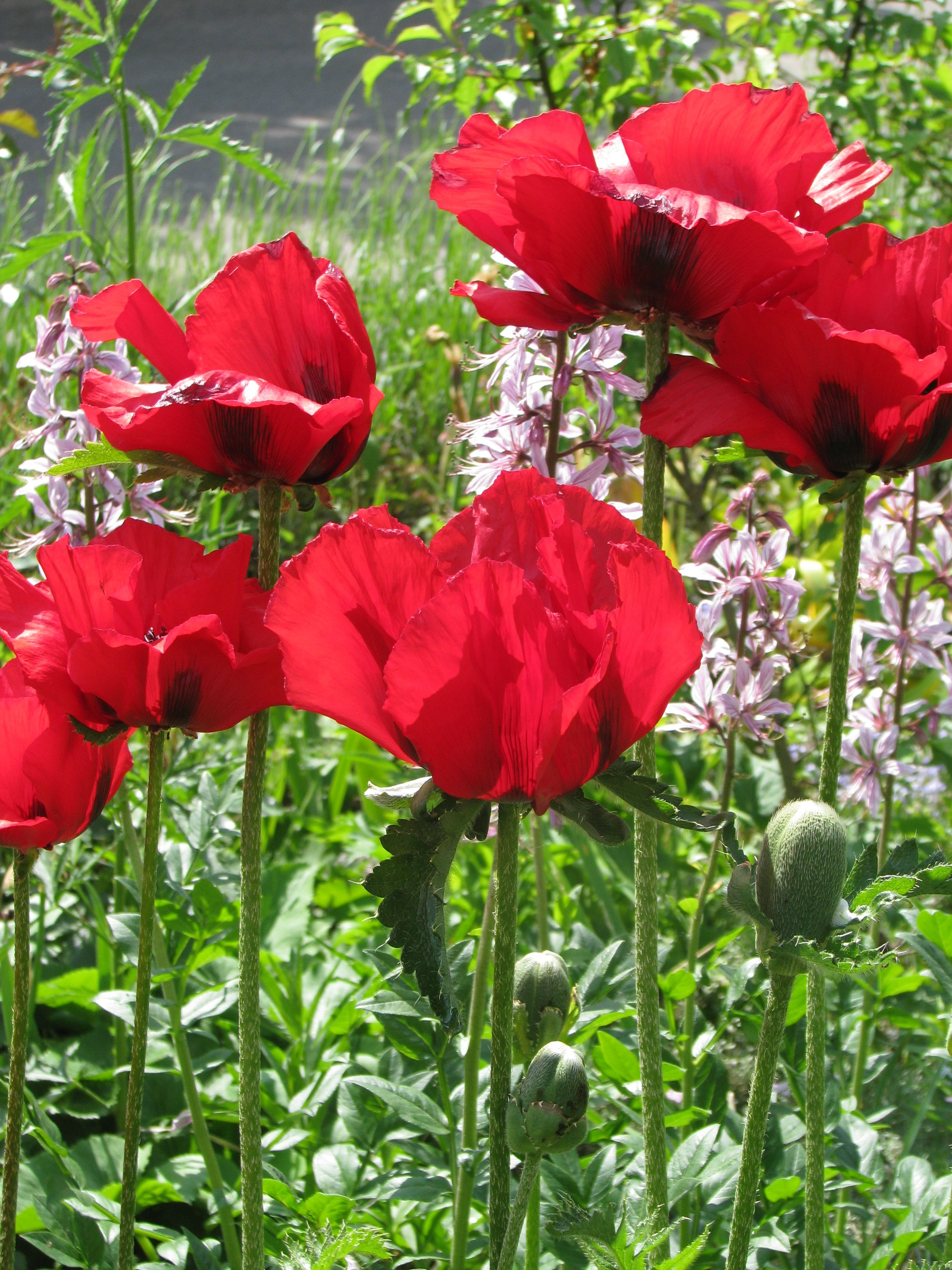

Scientific classification
- Kingdom: Plantae
- Clade: Tracheophytes
- Clade: Angiosperms
- Clade: Eudicots
- Order: Ranunculales
- Family: Papaveraceae
- Genus: Papaver
- Species: P. bracteatum

Binomial name
- Papaver bracteatum Lindl.

= Papaver bracteatum =

Species of flowering plant

Papaver bracteatum, also known as the Iranian poppy or Persian poppy and the great scarlet poppy (first described by Dr. N. Saharghi and Iraj Lalezari Nature 213, 1244, 1967 doi:10.1038/2131244a0 ) is a sturdy hardy perennial poppy with large deep red flowers up to 8 inches (20 cm) in diameter on stiff stalks up to 4 feet (1.22 metres) high with a prominent black spot near the base of the petals. It is closely related to the commonly cultivated oriental poppy, Papaver orientale and is sometimes recorded as the varietal form Papaver orientale var. bracteatum.

== Uses ==
This species is grown to produce thebaine, which is commercially converted to codeine and semi-synthetic opiates including hydrocodone, hydromorphone, oxycodone, and oxymorphone. Papaver bracteatum does not contain morphine, codeine or any other narcotic alkaloids in significant amounts. Oripavine has been reported in minute traces but would not exert a relevant activity.

In the United States, domestic cultivation of P. bracteatum was proposed by president Richard Nixon's Office of Management and Budget in the early 1970s as an alternative to Turkish opium poppies, which the administration was attempting to eliminate. This was because P. bracteatum does not contain morphine, which is converted to heroin, but is high in thebaine for legal codeine production, which was in crisis at the time because of the dwindling Turkish supply. However, US government scientists feared Bentley compounds, opioids thousands of times more potent than heroin, would replace heroin in the US.

The three species of Oriental poppy, Papaver orientale, Papaver orientale var. bracteatum and Papaver pseudo-orientale are thought to be the basis for up to 80 cultivars derived from cross-breeding and used extensively in ornamental gardens in Europe and the United States as well as elsewhere. Papaver orientale 'Beauty of Livermere' is regarded as so similar to, if not identical with, the wild P. bracteatum that it may well be a strain of P. bracteatum or at the very least a complex hybrid derived from it in large part and is now also referred to as P. orientale 'Goliath Group'.
