= Morphine 6-dehydrogenase =

Class of enzymes

morphine 6-dehydrogenase

Identifiers
- EC no.: 1.1.1.218
- CAS no.: 97002-71-6

Databases
- IntEnz: IntEnz view
- BRENDA: BRENDA entry
- ExPASy: NiceZyme view
- KEGG: KEGG entry
- MetaCyc: metabolic pathway
- PRIAM: profile
- PDB structures: RCSB PDB PDBe PDBsum
- Gene Ontology: AmiGO / QuickGO
Search
- PMC: articles
- PubMed: articles
- NCBI: proteins

In enzymology, a morphine 6-dehydrogenase (EC 1.1.1.218) is an enzyme that catalyzes the chemical reaction

morphine + NAD(P)^{+} $\rightleftharpoons$ morphinone + NAD(P)H + H^{+}

The 3 substrates of this enzyme are morphine, NAD^{+}, and NADP^{+}, whereas its 4 products are morphinone, NADH, NADPH, and H^{+}.

This enzyme belongs to the family of oxidoreductases, specifically those acting on the CH-OH group of donor with NAD^{+} or NADP^{+} as acceptor. The systematic name of this enzyme class is morphine:NAD(P)^{+} 6-oxidoreductase. Other names in common use include naloxone reductase, and reductase, naloxone. This enzyme participates in alkaloid biosynthesis i. This enzyme has at least one effector, Mercaptoethanol.
