= Thebaine =

Opiate alkaloid constituent of opium

- Skeletal formula

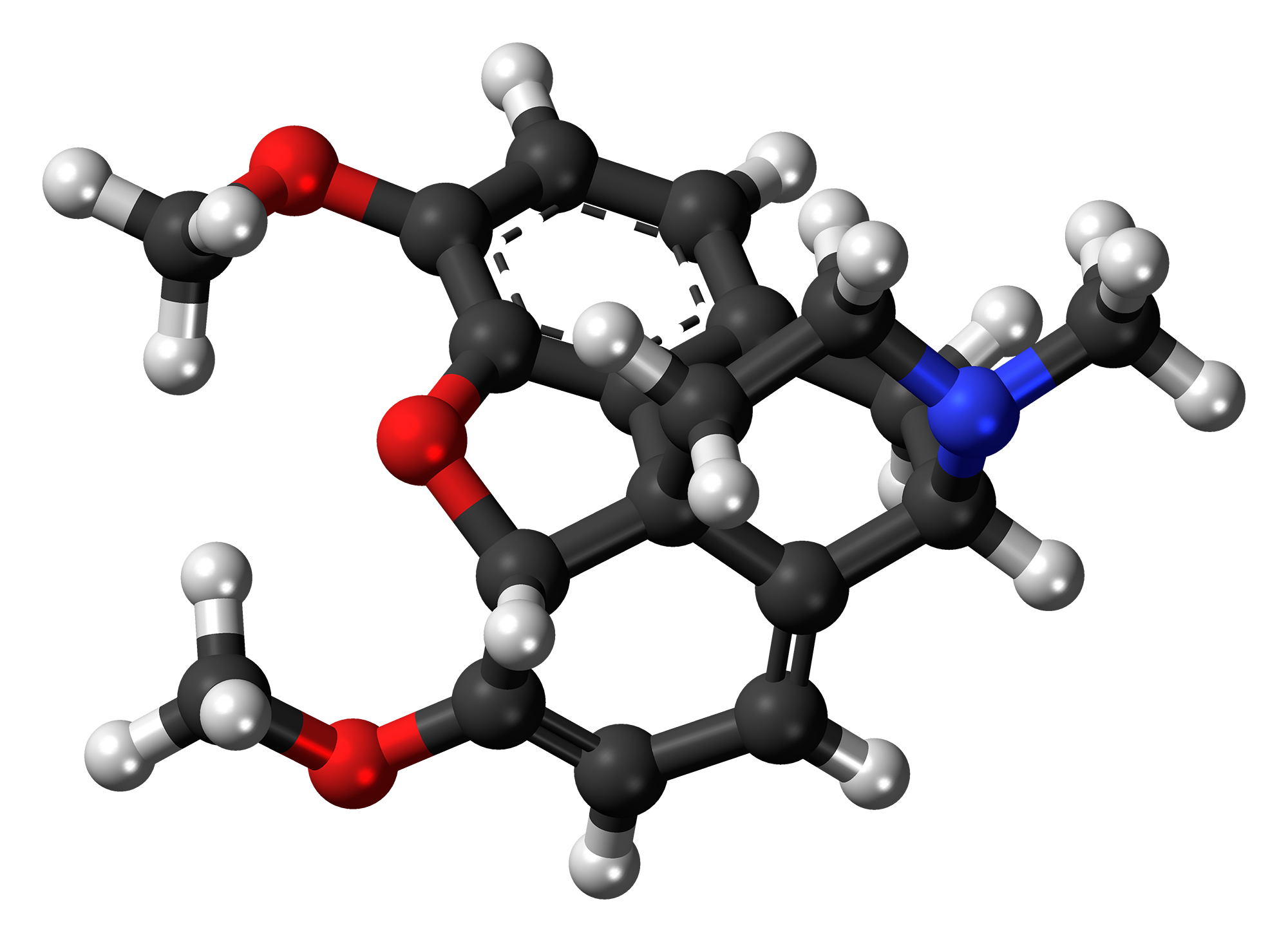
- Ball-and-stick model

Names
- IUPAC name 3,6-Dimethoxy-17-methyl-6,7,8,14-tetradehydro-4,5α-epoxymorphinan
- Systematic IUPAC name (4R,7aR,12bS)-7,9-Dimethoxy-3-methyl-2,3,4,7a-tetrahydro-1H-4,12-methano[1]benzofuro[3,2-e]isoquinoline
- Other names Paramorphine

Identifiers
CAS Number	115-37-7
3D model (JSmol)	Interactive image
ChEBI	CHEBI:9519
ChEMBL	ChEMBL403893
ChemSpider	4481822
ECHA InfoCard	100.003.713
KEGG	C06173
MeSH	Thebaine
PubChem CID	5324289
UNII	2P9MKG8GX7
CompTox Dashboard (EPA)	DTXSID7046099
- InChI: InChI=1S/C19H21NO3/c1-20-9-8-19-12-5-7-15(22-3)18(19)23-17-14(21-2)6-4-11(16(17)19)10-13(12)20/h4-7,13,18H,8-10H2,1-3H3/t13-,18+,19+/m1/s1 Key: FQXXSQDCDRQNQE-VMDGZTHMSA-N; InChI=1S/C19H21NO3/c1-20-9-8-19-12-5-7-15(22-3)18(19)23-17-14(21-2)6-4-11(16(17)19)10-13(12)20/h4-7,13,18H,8-10H2,1-3H3/t13-,18+,19+/m1/s1 Key: FQXXSQDCDRQNQE-VMDGZTHMBG; Key: FQXXSQDCDRQNQE-VMDGZTHMSA-N
- SMILES: COC1=CC=C2[C@@H](C3)N(C)CC[C@@]24C5=C3C=CC(OC)=C5O[C@@H]14

Properties
Chemical formula	C_{19}H_{21}NO_{3}
Molar mass	311.37 g/mol

Pharmacology
Dependence liability	Low
- Pharmacokinetics
Metabolism	O-demethylation
Legal status	AU: S8 (Controlled drug); BR: Class A1 (Narcotic drugs); CA: Schedule I; UK: Class A; US: Schedule II
- Except where otherwise noted, data are given for materials in their standard state (at 25 °C [77 °F], 100 kPa). Infobox references

Thebaine (paramorphine), also known as codeine methyl enol ether, is an opiate alkaloid, its name coming from the Greek Θῆβαι, Thēbai (Thebes), an ancient city in Upper Egypt. A minor constituent of opium, thebaine is chemically similar to both morphine and codeine, but has stimulatory rather than depressant effects. At high doses, it causes convulsions similar to strychnine poisoning. The synthetic enantiomer (+)-thebaine does show analgesic effects apparently mediated through opioid receptors, unlike the inactive natural enantiomer (−)-thebaine. While thebaine is not used therapeutically, it is the main alkaloid extracted from Papaver bracteatum (Iranian opium / Persian poppy) and can be converted industrially into a variety of compounds that do have medicinal value.

== Biosynthesis ==
The biosynthesis of thebaine starts with the amino acid tyrosine and proceeds via reticuline in a pathway leading to many benzylisoquinoline alkaloids. The final step is catalysed by the enzyme thebaine synthase, which forms a 2,3-dihydrofuran ring with loss of a molecule of acetic acid from 7-O-acetylsalutaridinol. The reaction occurs spontaneously in alkali but requires catalysis to occur rapidly under physiological conditions near pH 7.

7-O-acetylsalutaridinol
acetic acid
thebaine

=== Research ===
Thebaine has been produced by genetically modified E. coli.

== Metabolism in the opium poppy ==
In Papaver somniferum, there are two possible pathways to morphine from thebaine. These differ according to which methyl group in thebaine is first to be removed in an oxidation reaction.

=== Via neopinone ===
If the enol ether in thebaine is converted to a ketone by thebaine 6-O-demethylase, a methyl group leaves as formaldehyde, with the oxidation driven by molecular oxygen activated as a ferryl group Fe(IV)=O.

thebaine
Demethylase
Fe(IV)=O
Fe(II)
neopinone
+ H_{2}C=O

The alkaloid product of the reaction, neopinone, can spontaneously isomerise to the next intermediate, codeinone, in the pathway to morphine via codeine but this step is catalysed in opium poppy by the enzyme neopinone isomerase (NISO).

neopinone
NISO
codeinone

=== Via oripavine ===
The alternative sequence to morphine begins when the enzyme codeine 3-O-demethylase removes the methyl group from the phenolic oxygen, giving oripavine. Further transformations convert this to morphinone and finally morphine.

thebaine
oripavine
morphinone
morphine

== As controlled drug ==
Thebaine is controlled under international law, is listed as a Class A drug under the Misuse of Drugs Act 1971 in the United Kingdom, is controlled as an analog of a Schedule II drug per the Analog Act in the United States, and is controlled with its derivatives and salts, as a Schedule I substance of the Controlled Drugs and Substances Act in Canada. The 2013 US Drug Enforcement Administration (DEA) aggregate manufacturing quota for thebaine (ACSCN 9333) was unchanged from the previous year at 145 metric tons.

== Global production ==
In 2012, 158,000 kilograms of thebaine were produced. In 2013, Australia was the main producer of poppy straw rich in thebaine, followed by Spain and then France. By 2017, worldwide thebaine production dropped to 142,400 kg. Together, those three countries accounted for about 99 per cent of global production of such poppy straw. The seed capsules of Papaver bracteatum are the primary source of thebaine, with the stem additionally yielding a significant amount.

Although thebaine is not used therapeutically, it is a starting material for industrial productions of pharmaceutical drugs including hydrocodone, hydromorphone, oxycodone, oxymorphone, nalbuphine, naloxone, naltrexone, buprenorphine, butorphanol and etorphine.

== Adverse effects ==
The Canberra Times of 16 November 2022 reported that four batches of Hoyts brand poppy seeds were being recalled due to unusually high levels of thebaine, and that at least twelve people in New South Wales had required medical attention after ingesting them. As of 15 November 2022, Food Standards Australia New Zealand (FSANZ) is coordinating a national recall of a number of poppy seed products due to the potential presence of thebaine.

== See also ==
- Thebacon
- 6,14-Endoethenotetrahydrooripavine - the central nucleus of the Bentley compound class of opioids which are derived from thebaine
