= Etorphine =

Semi-synthetic opioid

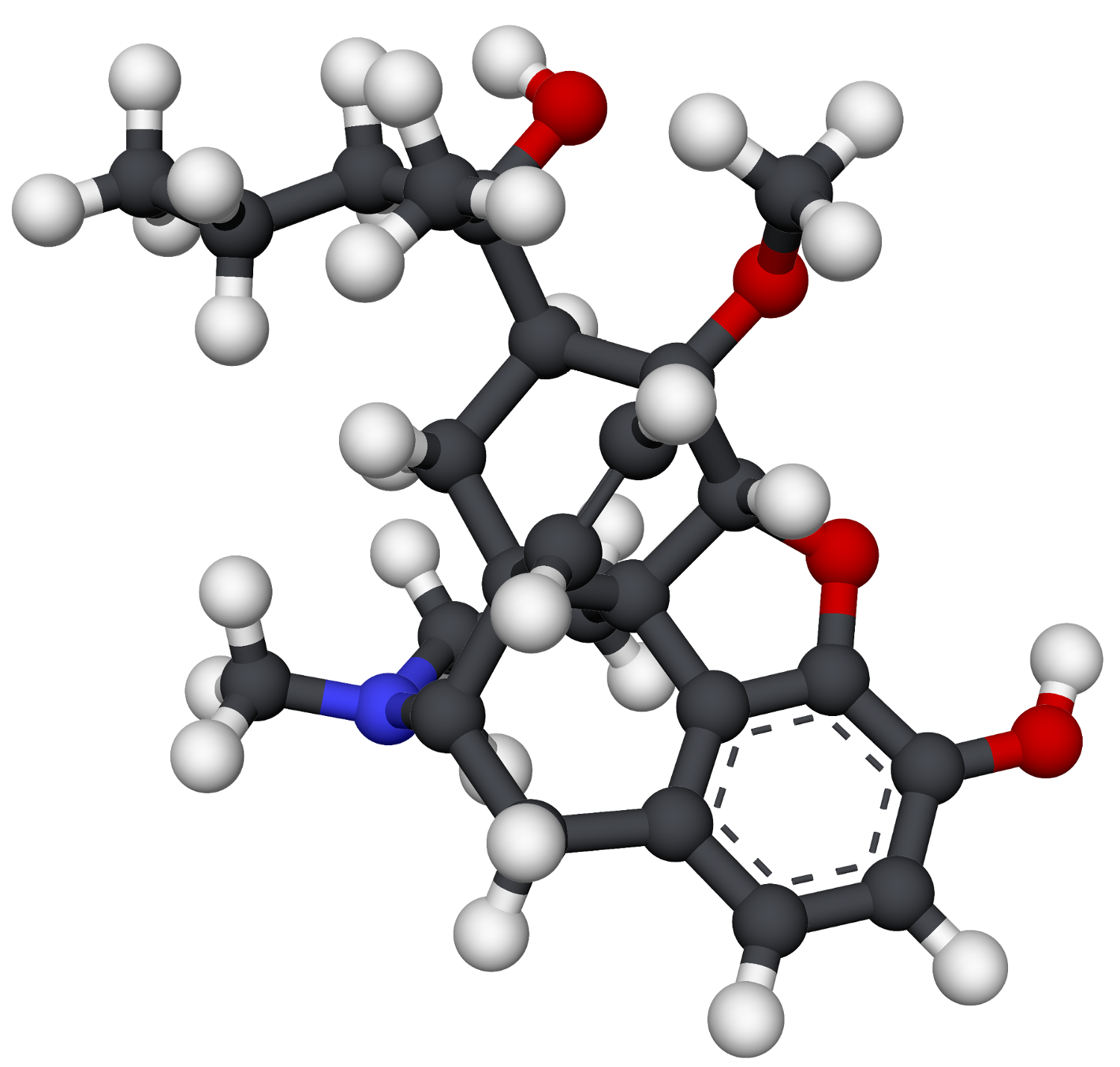

Clinical data
- AHFS/Drugs.com: International Drug Names
- ATCvet code: QN02AE90 (WHO)

Legal status
- Legal status: AU: S9 (Prohibited substance); BR: Class F1 (Prohibited narcotics); CA: Schedule I; DE: Anlage III (Special prescription form required); UK: Class A; US: Schedule I and Schedule II; UN: Narcotic Schedules I and IV; EU: List I (Netherlands); SE: Förteckning II

Identifiers
- IUPAC name: (5α,6β,14β,18R)-18-[(2R)-2-Hydroxy-2-pentanyl]-6-methoxy-17-methyl-7,8-didehydro-18,19-dihydro-4,5-epoxy-6,14-ethenomorphinan-3-ol
- CAS Number: 14521-96-1
- PubChem CID: 644209
- IUPHAR/BPS: 1625
- DrugBank: DB01497
- ChemSpider: 559231
- UNII: 42M2Y6NU9O
- KEGG: D07937
- ChEBI: CHEBI:4912
- ChEMBL: ChEMBL140050
- CompTox Dashboard (EPA): DTXSID40878669 DTXSID40878667, DTXSID40878669
- ECHA InfoCard: 100.035.017

Chemical and physical data
- Formula: C_{25}H_{33}NO_{4}
- Molar mass: 411.542 g·mol^{−1}
- 3D model (JSmol): Interactive image
- SMILES: C[C@](CCC)(O)[C@H]1C[C@]23C=C[C@]1(OC)[C@@H]4Oc5c(O)ccc6C[C@H]2N(C)CC[C@]43c65
- InChI: InChI=1S/C25H33NO4/c1-5-8-22(2,28)17-14-23-9-10-25(17,29-4)21-24(23)11-12-26(3)18(23)13-15-6-7-16(27)20(30-21)19(15)24/h6-7,9-10,17-18,21,27-28H,5,8,11-14H2,1-4H3/t17-,18-,21-,22-,23-,24+,25-/m1/s1; Key:CAHCBJPUTCKATP-FAWZKKEFSA-N

Etorphine (M99) is a semi-synthetic opioid possessing an analgesic potency approximately 1,000–3,000 times that of morphine. It was first prepared in 1960 from oripavine, which does not generally occur in opium poppy extract but rather the related plants Papaver orientale and Papaver bracteatum. It was reproduced in 1963 by a research group at MacFarlan Smith in Edinburgh, led by Kenneth Bentley. It can be produced from thebaine.

== Veterinary use ==
Etorphine is available legally only for veterinary use and is strictly governed by law. It is often used to immobilise elephants and other large mammals. Diprenorphine (Revivon) is an opioid receptor antagonist that can be administered in proportion to the amount of etorphine used (1.3 times) to reverse its effects. Veterinary-strength etorphine is fatal to humans. For this reason the package as supplied to vets always includes the human antidote along with the etorphine.

The human antidote is generally naloxone, not diprenorphine, and is always prepared before the preparation of etorphine to be immediately administered following accidental human exposure to etorphine. The LD_{50} in humans is 3 μg which led to the requirement that the medicine include an equivalent dose of an antidote.

One of its main advantages is its speed of operation, and more importantly, the speed that diprenorphine reverses its effects. The high incidence of side effects, including severe cardiopulmonary depression, has caused etorphine to fall into disfavor in general veterinary practice. However, its high potency, combined with the rapid action of both etorphine and its antagonist, diprenorphine, means that it has found a place for use in the capture of large mammals, such as rhinoceroses and elephants, where rapid onset and rapid recovery are both very important. The high potency of etorphine means that sufficient etorphine can be administered to large wild mammals by projectile syringe (dart).

Large Animal Immobilon is a combination of etorphine plus acepromazine maleate. An etorphine antidote Large Animal Revivon contains mainly diprenorphine for animals and a human-specific naloxone-based antidote, which should be prepared prior to the etorphine. A 5–15 mg dose is enough to immobilise an African elephant and a 2–4 mg dose is enough to immobilise a black rhinoceros.

== Pharmacology ==
Etorphine is a potent, non-selective full agonist of the μ-, δ-, and κ-opioid receptors. It has a weak affinity for the nociceptin receptor.

== Legal status ==
In Hong Kong, etorphine is regulated under Schedule 1 of Chapter 134 of the Dangerous Drugs Ordinance. It can be used legally only by health professionals and for university research purposes. The substance can be given by pharmacists under a prescription. Anyone who supplies the substance without prescription can be fined HKD$10,000. The penalty for trafficking or manufacturing the substance is a HKD$5,000,000 fine and life imprisonment. Possession for consumption without licence from the Department of Health is illegal, with a HKD$1,000,000 fine and/or 7 years of jail time.

In the Netherlands etorphine is a Schedule I drug of the Opium Law. It is used only for veterinary purposes in zoos to immobilise large animals.

In the United States etorphine is listed as a Schedule I (i.e. as not having any legal use) drug with an ACSCN of 9056, although its hydrochloride salt is classified as Schedule II (i.e. as having a legal use, such as tranquilization of large animals) with an ACSCN of 9059.

In the United Kingdom, under the Misuse of Drugs Act 1971, etorphine is controlled as a Class A substance.

In Italy etorphine is illegal, as are the parent compounds Dihydroetorphine and Acetorphine. (Data from 2022)

== In popular culture ==
- The fictional character Dexter Morgan uses Etorphine M-99 to capture and sedate his victims in the television series, Dexter, although this was retroactively changed to ketamine in the sequel series, Dexter: New Blood, only for etorphine to return in the succeeding series, Dexter: Original Sin and Dexter: Resurrection.
- In the film The Meg etorphine is used to neutralise the first megalodon.
- The fictional character Katherine Dutta uses etorphine to murder her victims in the television series Lewis, Lewis: Down Among the Fearful.
- In an Agatha Raisin book, a fictional veterinarian is murdered with the Immobilon he planned to use to sedate a horse for an operation.

== See also ==
- 6,14-Endoethenotetrahydrooripavine - the central nucleus of all Bentley compound opioids under which class etorphine falls
- 7-PET
- Dihydroetorphine – a close analog of etorphine that has been used as an opioid painkiller for human use in China
- Thienorphine
- Opioid potency comparison
