= Thebaine synthase =

Class of enzymes

Identifiers
- EC no.: 4.2.99.24

Databases
- IntEnz: IntEnz view
- BRENDA: BRENDA entry
- ExPASy: NiceZyme view
- KEGG: KEGG entry
- MetaCyc: metabolic pathway
- PRIAM: profile
- PDB structures: RCSB PDB PDBe PDBsum
Search
- PMC: articles
- PubMed: articles
- NCBI: proteins

Thebaine synthase (EC 4.2.99.24) is an enzyme isolated from the opium poppy, Papaver somniferum, that catalyzes the chemical reaction:

7-O-acetylsalutaridinol
acetic acid
thebaine

This is the final step in the biosynthesis of thebaine, forming a 2,3-dihydrofuran ring with loss of a molecule of acetic acid from 7-O-acetylsalutaridinol. The reaction occurs spontaneously in alkali but requires catalysis to occur rapidly under physiological conditions near pH 7. Thebaine is an intermediate to many other alkaloids including codeine and morphine.

The catalytic mechanism of the enzyme has been studied by crystallography. It is a type of S_{N}2 reaction.
