= Codeinone =

Names
- IUPAC name 3-Methoxy-17-methyl-7,8-didehydro-4,5α-epoxymorphinan-6-one
- Preferred IUPAC name (4R,4aR,7aR,12bS)-9-Methoxy-3-methyl-2,3,4,4a,7,7a-hexahydro-1H-4,12-methano[1]benzofuro[3,2-e]isoquinolin-7-one

Identifiers
CAS Number	467-13-0
3D model (JSmol)	Interactive image
ChEBI	CHEBI:18399
ChEMBL	ChEMBL257627
ChemSpider	4573639
ECHA InfoCard	100.006.716
KEGG	C06171
PubChem CID	5459910
UNII	22B5AW0ANN
CompTox Dashboard (EPA)	DTXSID70196909
- InChI: InChI=1S/C18H19NO3/c1-19-8-7-18-11-4-5-13(20)17(18)22-16-14(21-2)6-3-10(15(16)18)9-12(11)19/h3-6,11-12,17H,7-9H2,1-2H3/t11-,12+,17-,18-/m0/s1 Key: XYYVYLMBEZUESM-CMKMFDCUSA-N; InChI=1/C18H19NO3/c1-19-8-7-18-11-4-5-13(20)17(18)22-16-14(21-2)6-3-10(15(16)18)9-12(11)19/h3-6,11-12,17H,7-9H2,1-2H3/t11-,12+,17-,18-/m0/s1 Key: XYYVYLMBEZUESM-CMKMFDCUBF
- SMILES: O=C1\C=C/[C@H]5[C@@H]4N(CC[C@@]52c3c(O[C@@H]12)c(OC)ccc3C4)C

Properties
Chemical formula	C_{18}H_{19}NO_{3}
Molar mass	297.35 g/mol
- Except where otherwise noted, data are given for materials in their standard state (at 25 °C [77 °F], 100 kPa). verify (what is ?) Infobox references

Codeinone is an isoquinolone alkaloid found in the opium poppy. As an analgesic, it is one-third the potency of codeine. It is an important intermediate in the production of hydrocodone–a painkiller about three-quarters the potency of morphine–as well as of oxycodone, though the latter can also be synthesized from thebaine.

== Chemical structure ==
Codeinone can be described as the methylether of morphinone: 3-methyl-morphinone.

Codeinone can be also described as the ketone of codeine: codeine-6-one.

== Apoptotic activity ==
Through renewed interest into possible anti-tumor activities of some of the opium alkaloids and derivatives, unrelated to their antinociceptive properties and habit-forming effects, the oxidation product of codeine has been found to induce cell death in three different human cancer cell lines in vitro.
