= Oripavine =

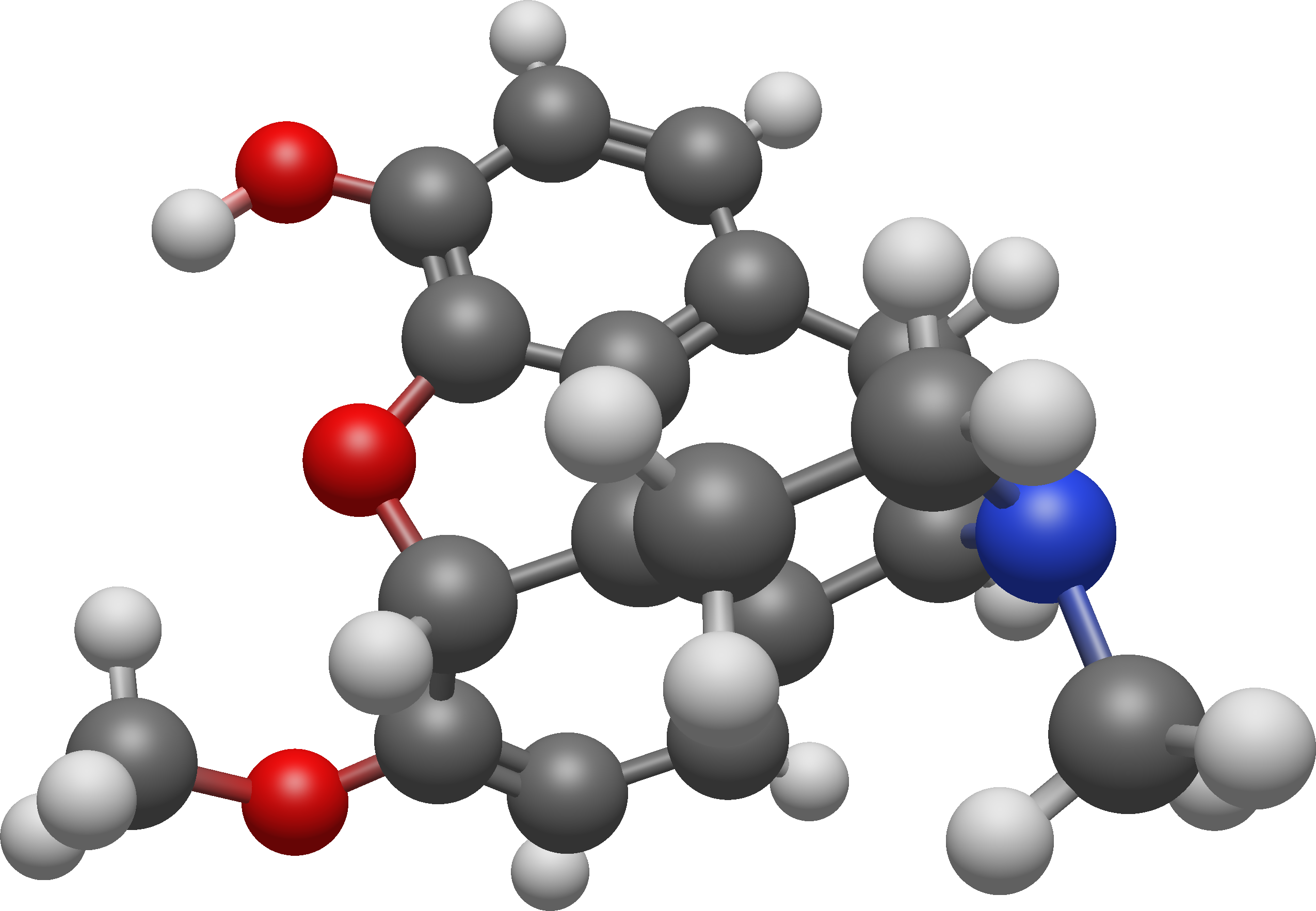

Names
- IUPAC name 6,7,8,14-Tetradehydro-4,5α-epoxy-6-methoxy-17-methylmorphinan-3-ol
- Other names 3-O-desmethylthebaine

Identifiers
CAS Number	467-04-9
3D model (JSmol)	Interactive image
ChEBI	CHEBI:7782
ChEMBL	ChEMBL437602
ChemSpider	4575366
ECHA InfoCard	100.006.715
EC Number	207-385-6
KEGG	C06175
MeSH	Oripavine
PubChem CID	5462306
UNII	575AOU51CR
CompTox Dashboard (EPA)	DTXSID10196908
- InChI: InChI=1S/C18H19NO3/c1-19-8-7-18-11-4-6-14(21-2)17(18)22-16-13(20)5-3-10(15(16)18)9-12(11)19/h3-6,12,17,20H,7-9H2,1-2H3/t12-,17+,18+/m1/s1 Key: ZKLXUUYLEHCAMF-UUWFMWQGSA-N; InChI=1S/C18H19NO3/c1-19-8-7-18-11-4-6-14(21-2)17(18)22-16-13(20)5-3-10(15(16)18)9-12(11)19/h3-6,12,17,20H,7-9H2,1-2H3/t12-,17+,18+/m1/s1 Key: ZKLXUUYLEHCAMF-UUWFMWQGBL; Key: ZKLXUUYLEHCAMF-UUWFMWQGSA-N
- SMILES: OC1=C(O[C@H]2C(OC)=CC=C3[C@@]42CCN5C)C4=C(C[C@H]35)C=C1

Properties
Chemical formula	C_{18}H_{19}NO_{3}
Molar mass	297.348 g/mol

Pharmacology
ATC code	N02A (WHO)
Routes of administration	SC
Legal status	BR: Class A1 (Narcotic drugs); US: Schedule II
- Except where otherwise noted, data are given for materials in their standard state (at 25 °C [77 °F], 100 kPa). verify (what is ?) Infobox references

Oripavine is an opioid and the major metabolite of thebaine. It is the precursor to the semi-synthetic compounds etorphine and buprenorphine. Although this chemical compound has analgesic potency comparable to morphine, it is not used clinically due to severe adverse effects and a low therapeutic index. Being a precursor to a series of extremely strong opioids, oripavine is a controlled substance in some jurisdictions.

== Pharmacological properties ==
Oripavine possesses an analgesic potency comparable to morphine; however, it is not clinically useful due to severe toxicity and low therapeutic index. In both mice and rats, toxic doses caused tonic-clonic seizures followed by death, similar to thebaine. Oripavine has a potential for dependence which is significantly greater than that of thebaine but slightly less than that of morphine.

=== Bridged derivatives (The Bentley compounds) ===
Of much greater relevance are the properties of the orvinols, a large family of semi-synthetic oripavine derivatives classically synthesized by the Diels-Alder reaction of thebaine with an appropriate dienophile followed by 3-O-demethylation to the corresponding bridged oripavine. These compounds were developed by the group led by K. W. Bentley in the 1960s, and these Bentley compounds represent the first series of "super-potent" μ-opioid agonists, with some compounds in the series being over 10,000 times the potency of morphine as an analgesic. The simple bridged oripavine parent compound 6,14-endoethenotetrahydrooripavine is already 40 times the potency of morphine, but adding a branched tertiary alcohol substituent on the C7 position results in a wide range of highly potent compounds.

Drug name	R	Analgesic Potency (Morphine = 1)
	isobutyl	10
	phenyl	34
	n-hexyl	58
	methyl	63
	cyclopentyl	70
	ethyl	330
	phenethyl	2200
Etorphine	n-propyl	3200
TL 2636	cyclohexyl	3400
	n-pentyl	4500
	n-butyl	5200
M-140	isopentyl	9200

Other notable derivatives then result from further modification of this template, with saturation of the 7,8-double bond of etorphine resulting in the even more potent dihydroetorphine (up to 12,000× potency of morphine) and acetylation of the 3-hydroxy group of etorphine resulting in acetorphine (8700× morphine). While the isopentyl homologue of etorphine, known as M-140, is nearly three times more potent, its 7,8-dihydro and 3-acetyl derivatives are less potent than the corresponding derivatives of etorphine at 11,000 and 1300 times morphine, respectively. Replacing the N-methyl group with cyclopropylmethyl results in opioid antagonists such as diprenorphine (M5050, which is used as an antidote to reverse the effects of etorphine, M99), and partial agonists such as buprenorphine, which is widely used in the treatment of opioid addiction, although conversely the N-cyclopropylmethyl derivative of M-140, which has the code number M-320, retains similarly potent μ-opioid full agonist activity to the N-methyl derivative. More complex substitutions on the ring system can be used to produce selective δ-opioid agonists such as BU-48, and selective κ-opioid agonists such as CL 110,393.

== Legal status ==
Due to the relative ease of synthetic modification of oripavine to produce other narcotics (by either direct or indirect routes via thebaine), the World Health Organization's Expert Committee on Drug Dependence recommended in 2003 that oripavine be controlled under Schedule I of the 1961 Single Convention on Narcotic Drugs. On March 14, 2007, the United Nations Commission on Narcotic Drugs formally decided to accept these recommendations, and placed oripavine in the Schedule I.

Until recently, oripavine was a Schedule II drug in the United States by default as a thebaine derivative, although it was not explicitly listed. However, as a member state under the 1961 Single Convention on Narcotic Drugs, the US was obliged to specifically control the substance under the Controlled Substances Act following its international control by the UN Commission on Narcotic Drugs. On September 24, 2007, the Drug Enforcement Administration formally added oripavine to Schedule II.

Under the Controlled Substances Act 1970, oripavine has an ACSCN of 9330 and a 2013 manufacturing quota of 22,750 kg (50,160 lb).

== Biosynthesis ==
This molecule is biosynthetically related to the morphinane derivatives metabolism, where thebaine and morphine are implicated.

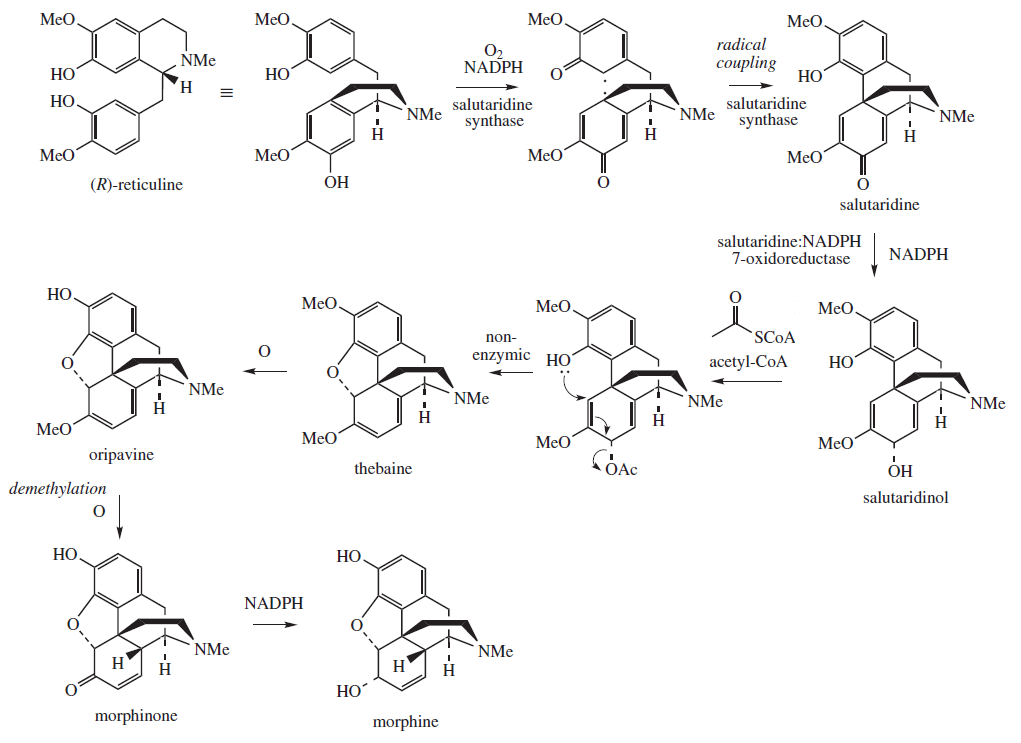
Morphine biosynthesis
