= Thienorphine =

Chemical compound

Clinical data
- ATC code: None

Identifiers
- IUPAC name: (1R,2R,6S,15R)-3-(cyclopropylmethyl)-16-[(2R)-2-hydroxy-4-(thiophen-2-yl)butan-2-yl]-15-methoxy-13-oxa-3-azahexacyclo[13.2.2.1^{2,8}.0^{1,6}.0^{6,14}.0^{7,12}]icosa-7,9,11-trien-11-ol
- PubChem CID: 102212421
- ChemSpider: 58539334

Chemical and physical data
- Formula: C_{31}H_{39}NO_{4}S
- Molar mass: 521.72 g·mol^{−1}
- 3D model (JSmol): Interactive image
- SMILES: C[C@@](CCc1cccs1)([C@H]2C[C@@]34CCC2([C@H]5[C@@]36CCN([C@@H]4Cc7c6c(c(cc7)O)O5)CC8CC8)OC)O
- InChI: InChI=1S/C31H39NO4S/c1-28(34,10-9-21-4-3-15-37-21)23-17-29-11-12-31(23,35-2)27-30(29)13-14-32(18-19-5-6-19)24(29)16-20-7-8-22(33)26(36-27)25(20)30/h3-4,7-8,15,19,23-24,27,33-34H,5-6,9-14,16-18H2,1-2H3/t23-,24-,27-,28-,29-,30+,31-/m1/s1; Key:WTGSHWLSWVFVAH-JTTXIWGLSA-N

Thienorphine is a very potent, extremely long-acting, orally-active opioid analgesic with mixed agonist–antagonist properties which was developed by the Beijing Institute of Pharmacology and Toxicology as a potential non-addictive analgesic and treatment for opioid dependence. It is a high-affinity, balanced ligand of the μ- (K_{i} = 0.22 nM), δ- (K_{i} = 0.69 nM), and κ-opioid receptors (K_{i} = 0.14 nM), behaving as a partial agonist of the μ- (E_{max} = 19%–28%) and κ-opioid receptors (E_{max} = 65–75%) and as an antagonist of the δ-opioid receptor. It also possesses relatively low affinity for the nociceptin receptor (K_{i} = 36.5 nM), where it acts as an antagonist.

== See also ==
- Buprenorphine
- Etorphine
- Dihydroetorphine
- Diprenorphine
- TH-030418
