= Acetorphine =

Opioid analgesic and anesthetic veterinary drug

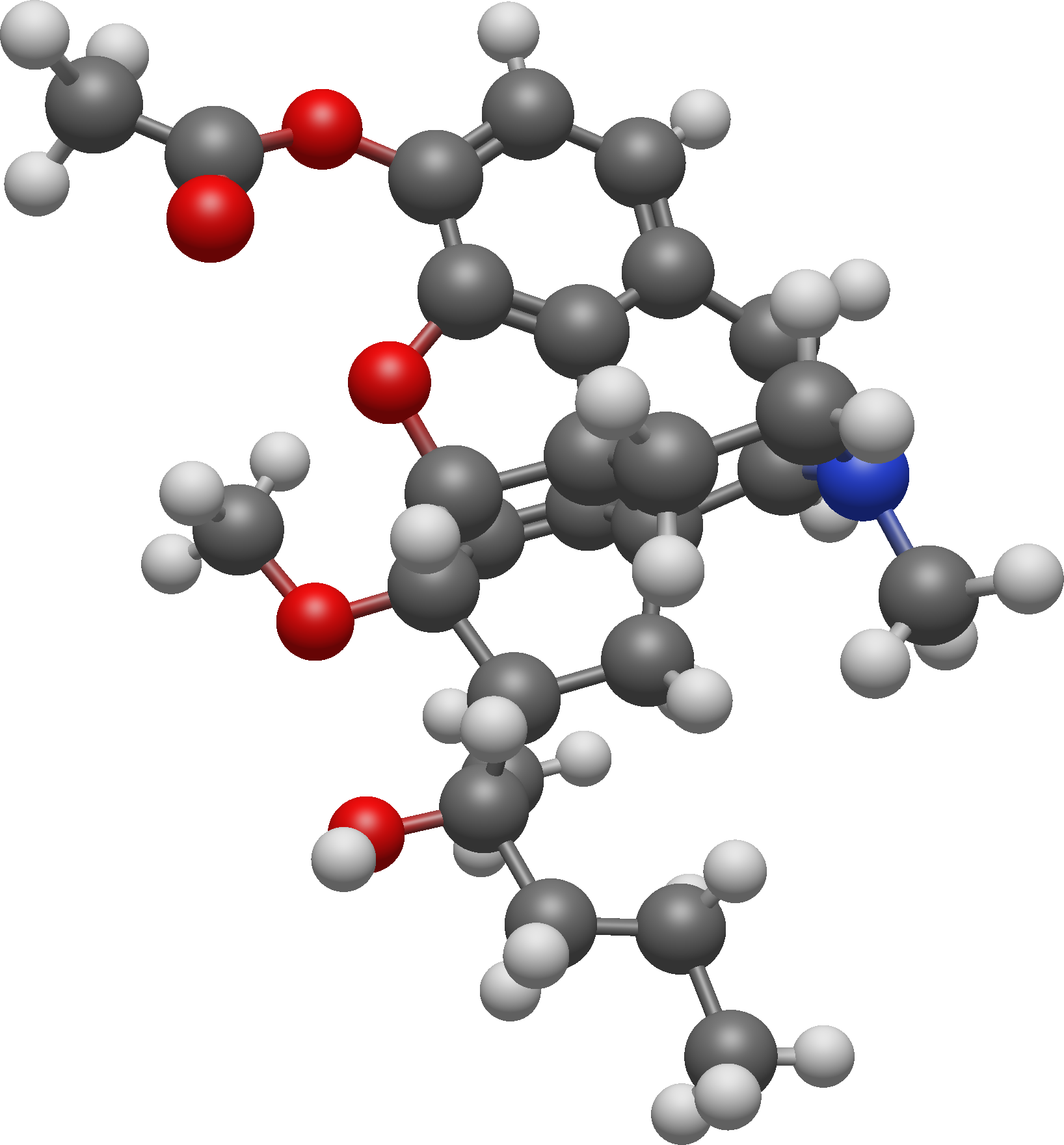

Clinical data
- ATC code: none

Legal status
- Legal status: AU: S9 (Prohibited substance); BR: Class F1 (Prohibited narcotics); CA: Schedule I; DE: Anlage I (Authorized scientific use only); UK: Class A; US: Schedule I; UN: Narcotic Schedules I and IV

Identifiers
- IUPAC name: 4,5α-epoxy-7α-(1-hydroxy-1-methylbutyl)-6-methoxy-17-methyl-6,14-endo-ethenomorphinan-3-yl acetate
- CAS Number: 25333-77-1
- PubChem CID: 62795
- DrugBank: DB01469
- ChemSpider: 16736130
- UNII: 2OGQ81529L
- KEGG: D12700
- CompTox Dashboard (EPA): DTXSID60905123
- ECHA InfoCard: 100.291.523

Chemical and physical data
- Formula: C_{27}H_{35}NO_{5}
- Molar mass: 453.579 g·mol^{−1}
- 3D model (JSmol): Interactive image
- SMILES: C[C@@](O)(CCC)[C@H]6C[C@]43/C=C/[C@]6(OC)[C@@H]1Oc5c2c(C[C@H]4N(C)CC[C@@]123)ccc5OC(C)=O
- InChI: InChI=1S/C27H35NO5/c1-6-9-24(3,30)19-15-25-10-11-27(19,31-5)23-26(25)12-13-28(4)20(25)14-17-7-8-18(32-16(2)29)22(33-23)21(17)26/h7-8,10-11,19-20,23,30H,6,9,12-15H2,1-5H3/t19-,20-,23-,24-,25-,26+,27-/m1/s1; Key:LFYBMMHFJIAKFE-PMEKXCSPSA-N

Acetorphine is a potent opioid analgesic, up to 8700 times stronger than morphine by weight. It is a derivative of the more well-known opioid etorphine, which is used as a very potent veterinary painkiller and anesthetic medication, primarily for the sedation of large animals such as elephants, giraffes and rhinos.

Acetorphine was developed in 1966 by the Reckitt research group that developed etorphine. Acetorphine was developed for the same purpose as etorphine itself, namely as a strong tranquilizer for use in immobilizing large animals in veterinary medicine. Despite showing some advantages over etorphine, for instance producing less toxic side effects in giraffes, acetorphine was never widely adopted for veterinary use, and etorphine (along with other tranquilizers such as carfentanil and azaperone) remains the drug of choice in this application.

== Legal status ==
=== Australia ===
Acetorphine is a schedule 9 substance in Australia under the Poisons Standard (February 2017). A schedule 9 drug is outlined in the Poisons Act 1964 as "Substances which may be abused or misused, the manufacture, possession, sale or use of which should be prohibited by law except when required for medical or scientific research, or for analytical, teaching or training purposes with approval of the CEO."

Under the Misuse of Drugs Act 1981 6.0 g is the amount required determining a court of trial, 2.0 g is considered intent to sell and supply.

=== Germany ===
Acetorphine is illegal in Germany (Anlage I).

=== Indonesia ===
Acetorphine is considered as a class 1 narcotic drug in Indonesia, along with etorphine and dihydroetorphine. A class 1 narcotic drug can only be used for scientific development purposes and not be used in therapy.

=== Italy ===
In Italy acetorphine is illegal, as are the parent compounds etorphine and dihydroetorphine.

=== Romania ===
Acetorphine is prohibited in Romania.

=== United Kingdom ===
Acetorphine is considered a Class A drug by the UK Misuse of Drugs Act since 1971, making its unlawful possession and distribution illegal. Class A drugs are deemed to be the most dangerous.

=== United States ===
Acetorphine is a Schedule I controlled substance in the United States. Its DEA Administrative Controlled Substances Control Number is 9319 and the one salt in use, acetorphine hydrochloride, has a freebase conversion ratio of 0.93.

== See also ==
- 6,14-Endoethenotetrahydrooripavine
