= Dihydroetorphine =

Opioid analgesic drug

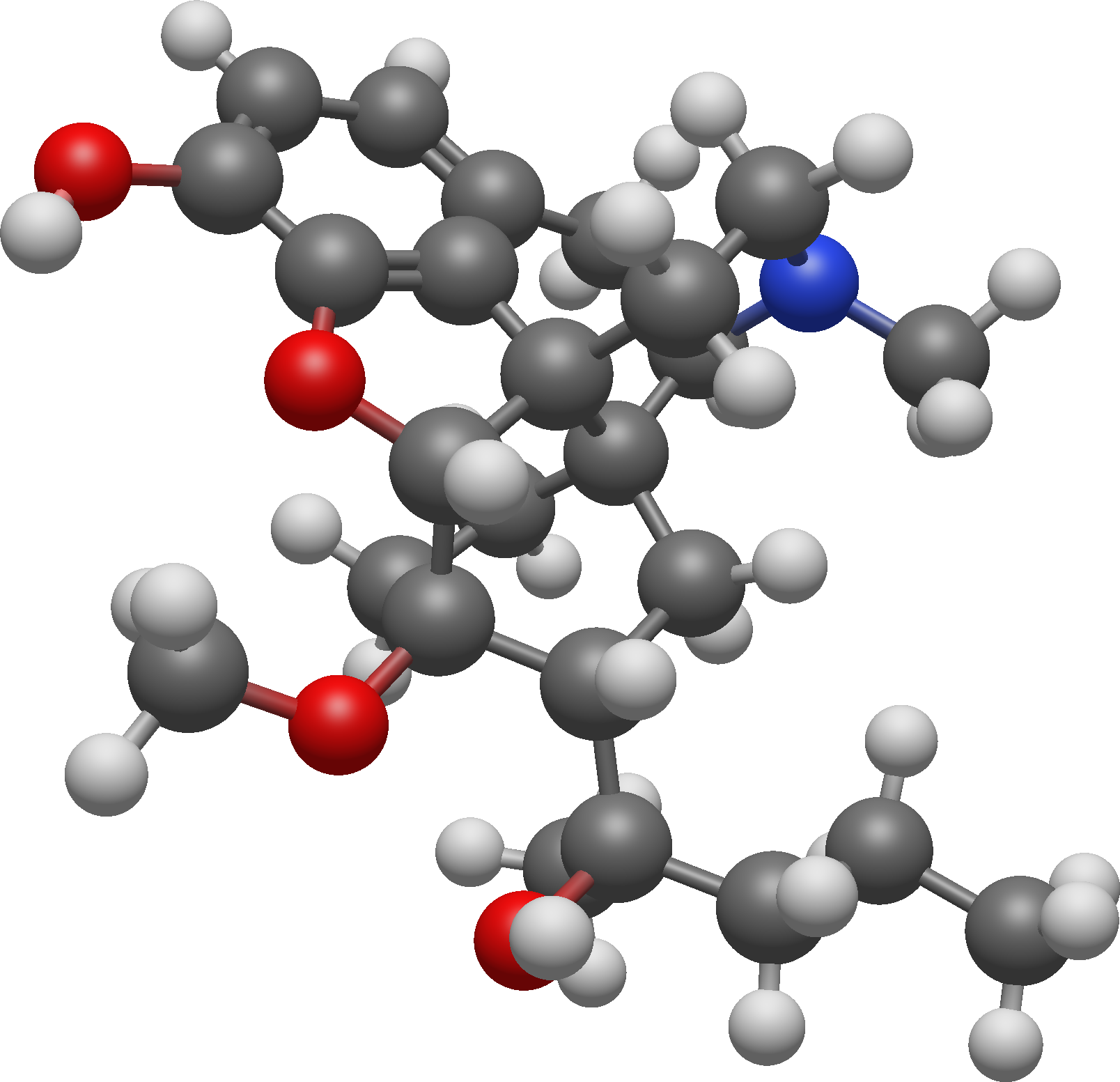

Clinical data
- ATC code: none

Legal status
- Legal status: BR: Class F1 (Prohibited narcotics); DE: Anlage I (Authorized scientific use only); US: Schedule II

Identifiers
- IUPAC name: (5R,6R,7R,9R,13S,14R)-7-[(R)-2-Hydroxypentan-2-yl] -6-methoxy-17-methyl-4,5-epoxy-6,14-ethanomorphinan-3-ol
- CAS Number: 14357-76-7
- PubChem CID: 107765
- DrugBank: DB01450
- ChemSpider: 96924
- UNII: QQX8S479YV
- KEGG: C22732
- CompTox Dashboard (EPA): DTXSID60905082
- ECHA InfoCard: 100.214.784

Chemical and physical data
- Formula: C_{25}H_{35}NO_{4}
- Molar mass: 413.558 g·mol^{−1}
- 3D model (JSmol): Interactive image
- SMILES: Oc6ccc4c1c6O[C@H]3[C@]5(OC)[C@H](C[C@@]2([C@H](N(CC[C@@]123)C)C4)CC5)[C@@](O)(C)CCC
- InChI: InChI=1S/C25H35NO4/c1-5-8-22(2,28)17-14-23-9-10-25(17,29-4)21-24(23)11-12-26(3)18(23)13-15-6-7-16(27)20(30-21)19(15)24/h6-7,17-18,21,27-28H,5,8-14H2,1-4H3/t17-,18-,21-,22-,23-,24+,25-/m1/s1; Key:BRTSNYPDACNMIP-FAWZKKEFSA-N

Dihydroetorphine was developed by K. W. Bentley at McFarlan-Smith in the 1960s and is a potent opioid analgesic used mainly in China. It is a derivative of the better-known opioid etorphine, a very potent veterinary painkiller and anesthetic medication used primarily for the sedation of large animals such as elephants, giraffes, and rhinos.

Dihydroetorphine is a semi-synthetic opioid used mainly as a strong painkiller for humans. It is several thousand times stronger than morphine (between 1000× and 12000× more potent depending what method is used for comparison), although it is poorly absorbed when taken orally. Sublingual forms of dihydroetorphine are used in China at doses ranging from 20 to 40 μg repeated every 3–4 hours, and are reported to cause strong analgesia and relatively mild side effects compared to other opioids, although all the usual opioid side effects such as dizziness, sedation, nausea, constipation, and respiratory depression can occur. Transdermal patches of dihydroetorphine have also been developed.

Dihydroetorphine is considered to be somewhat less addictive than many other opioids, and it is also sometimes used in China as a substitute maintenance drug for opioid addicts, in a similar fashion to how the related drug buprenorphine is used in western nations. It is presumably controlled as an "ester, ether, [or] salt" of etorphine in the United States under the Controlled Substances Act 1970, and/or its pieces of the morphine carbon skeleton put it under the "morphine rule" thereof and/or the 1986 analogues act; it does not have its own ACSCN. Regulation elsewhere may vary but would likely be similar to that for other strong opioid agonists.

Dihydroetorphine is illegal in Italy, as are its parent compounds etorphine and acetorphine.

== See also ==
- Thienorphine
- Carfentanil
- List of fentanyl analogues
- Opioid potency comparison
