= Bentley compounds =

Class of potent semi-synthetic opioids

General structure of a Bentley compound with an ethano-bridge (single bond)

General structure of a Bentley compound with an etheno-bridge (double bond)

The Bentley compounds are a class of semi-synthetic opioids that were first synthesized by K. W. Bentley by Diels-Alder reaction of thebaine with various dienophiles. The compounds are also known as thevinols, orvinols, or bridged oripavine derivatives, due to the characteristic 6,14-endo-ethano- or etheno-bridge and substitution at the 7α position. Buprenorphine and etorphine are perhaps the best known of the family, which was the first series of extremely potent μ-opioid agonists, with some compounds in the series having over many thousands of times the analgesic potency of morphine.

== See also ==
- Oripavine#Bridged derivatives
