= Diprenorphine =

Chemical compound

- Skeletal formula of diprenorphine

- Ball-and-stick model of diprenorphine

Clinical data
- Trade names: Revivon
- Other names: Diprenorfin; M5050
- AHFS/Drugs.com: International Drug Names
- ATCvet code: QV03AB92 (WHO)

Identifiers
- IUPAC name: (5α,7α)-17-(Cyclopropylmethyl)- 4,5-epoxy- 18,19-dihydro- 3-hydroxy- 6-methoxy- α,α-dimethyl- 6,14-ethenomorphinan- 7-methanol
- CAS Number: 14357-78-9
- PubChem CID: 443408
- IUPHAR/BPS: 1617
- DrugBank: DB01548
- ChemSpider: 391634
- UNII: 1F0L5N25ZZ
- KEGG: D07863
- ChEMBL: ChEMBL281786
- CompTox Dashboard (EPA): DTXSID00903941
- ECHA InfoCard: 100.034.826

Chemical and physical data
- Formula: C_{26}H_{35}NO_{4}
- Molar mass: 425.569 g·mol^{−1}
- 3D model (JSmol): Interactive image
- SMILES: CC(C)([C@H]1C[C@@]23CC[C@@]1([C@H]4[C@@]25CCN([C@@H]3CC6=C5C(=C(C=C6)O)O4)CC7CC7)OC)O
- InChI: InChI=1S/C26H35NO4/c1-23(2,29)18-13-24-8-9-26(18,30-3)22-25(24)10-11-27(14-15-4-5-15)19(24)12-16-6-7-17(28)21(31-22)20(16)25/h6-7,15,18-19,22,28-29H,4-5,8-14H2,1-3H3/t18-,19-,22-,24-,25+,26-/m1/s1; Key:OIJXLIIMXHRJJH-KNLIIKEYSA-N

Diprenorphine, also known as diprenorfin and sold under the brand name Revivon, is a non-selective, high-affinity, weak partial agonist of the μ- (MOR), κ- (KOR), and δ-opioid receptor (DOR) (with equal affinity) which is used in veterinary medicine as an opioid antagonist. It is used to reverse the effects of super-potent opioid analgesics such as etorphine and carfentanil that are used for tranquilizing large animals. The drug is not approved for use in humans. Diprenorphine was the preferred reversal for etorphine but today naltrexone is preferred due to being a full antagonist. Effects occur within 1–3 minutes when given IV and 15–20 minutes given IM.

Diprenorphine is the strongest opioid antagonist that is commercially available (some 100 times more potent than nalorphine), and is used for reversing the effects of very strong opioids for which the binding affinity is so high that naloxone does not effectively or reliably reverse the narcotic effects.

Diprenorphine is used as a reversal agent for etorphine and carfentanil, and is normally used to remobilise animals once veterinary procedures have been completed. Since diprenorphine also has partial agonistic properties of its own, it should not be used on humans if they are accidentally exposed to etorphine or carfentanil. Naloxone or naltrexone is the preferred human opioid receptor antagonist.

Because diprenorphine is a weak partial agonist of the opioid receptors rather than a silent antagonist, it can produce some opioid effects in the absence of other opioids at sufficient doses. Moreover, due to partial agonism of the KOR, where it appears to possess significantly greater intrinsic activity relative to the MOR, diprenorphine can produce sedation as well as, in humans, hallucinations.
