= Morphinone =

- Structural formula

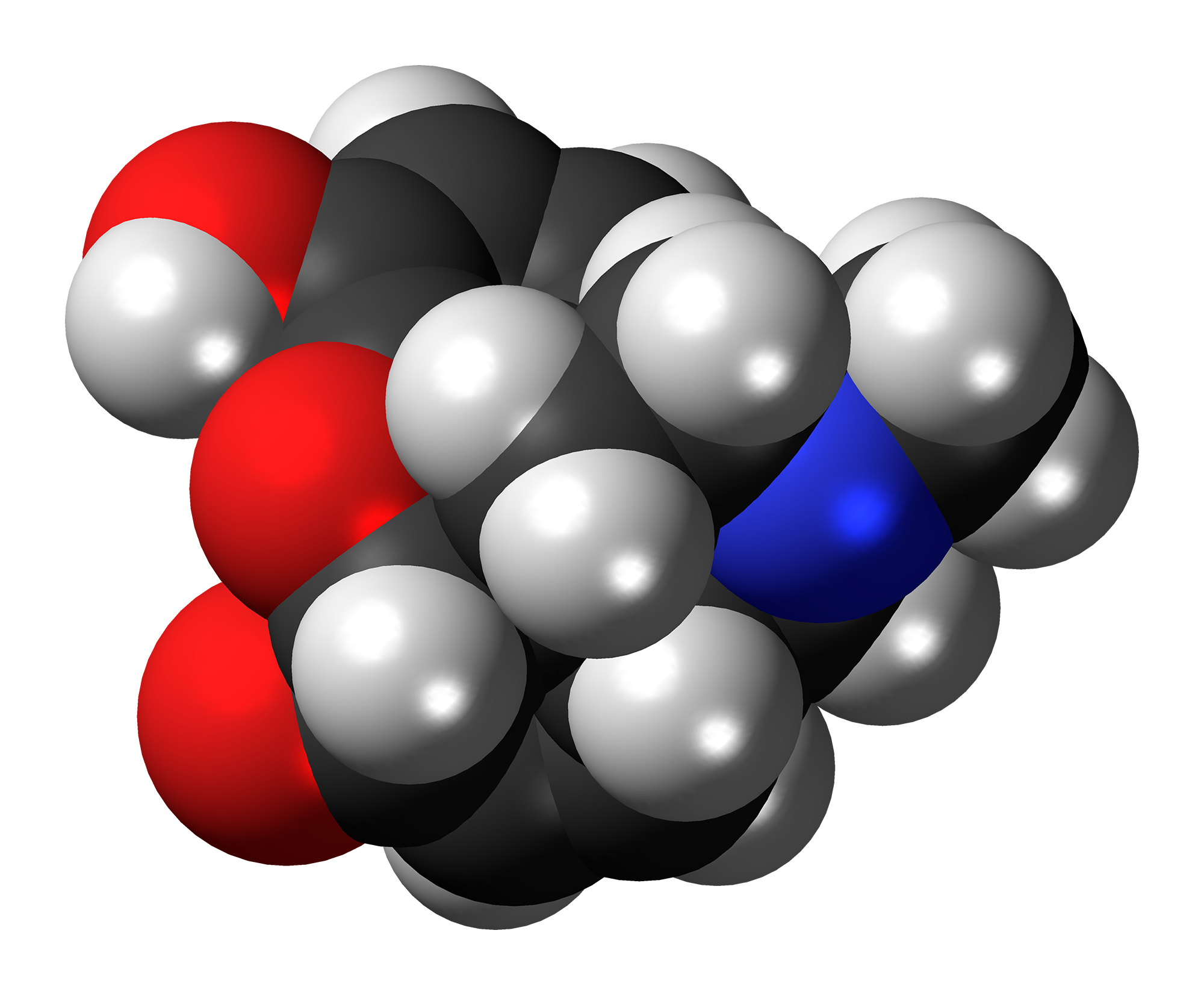
- Space-filling model

Names
- IUPAC name (5α)-3-Hydroxy-17-methyl-7,8-didehydro-4,5-epoxy-morphinan-6-one

Identifiers
CAS Number	467-02-7
3D model (JSmol)	Interactive image
ChEBI	CHEBI:16315
ChEMBL	ChEMBL255467
ChemSpider	4573586
ECHA InfoCard	100.006.714
KEGG	C01735
PubChem CID	5459823
UNII	28MBK63MAW
CompTox Dashboard (EPA)	DTXSID50196907
- InChI: InChI=1S/C17H17NO3/c1-18-7-6-17-10-3-5-13(20)16(17)21-15-12(19)4-2-9(14(15)17)8-11(10)18/h2-5,10-11,16,19H,6-8H2,1H3/t10-,11+,16-,17-/m0/s1 Key: PFBSOANQDDTNGJ-YNHQPCIGSA-N; InChI=1/C17H17NO3/c1-18-7-6-17-10-3-5-13(20)16(17)21-15-12(19)4-2-9(14(15)17)8-11(10)18/h2-5,10-11,16,19H,6-8H2,1H3/t10-,11+,16-,17-/m0/s1 Key: PFBSOANQDDTNGJ-YNHQPCIGBO
- SMILES: O=C1\C=C/[C@H]5[C@@H]4N(CC[C@@]52c3c(O[C@@H]12)c(O)ccc3C4)C

Properties
Chemical formula	C_{17}H_{17}NO_{3}
Molar mass	283.327 g·mol^{−1}
- Except where otherwise noted, data are given for materials in their standard state (at 25 °C [77 °F], 100 kPa). verify (what is ?) Infobox references

Morphinone is an opioid that is the intermediate when morphine is being converted to hydromorphone (trade name Dilaudid).

== Chemical structure ==
Morphinone can be described as the ketone of morphine.

== Legal status ==
Morphinone itself is an active opioid, though its potency is closer to codeine than morphine. It is, however, an important precursor and would fall under the purview of the Controlled Substances Act within the United States. Its legal status in other countries varies.
