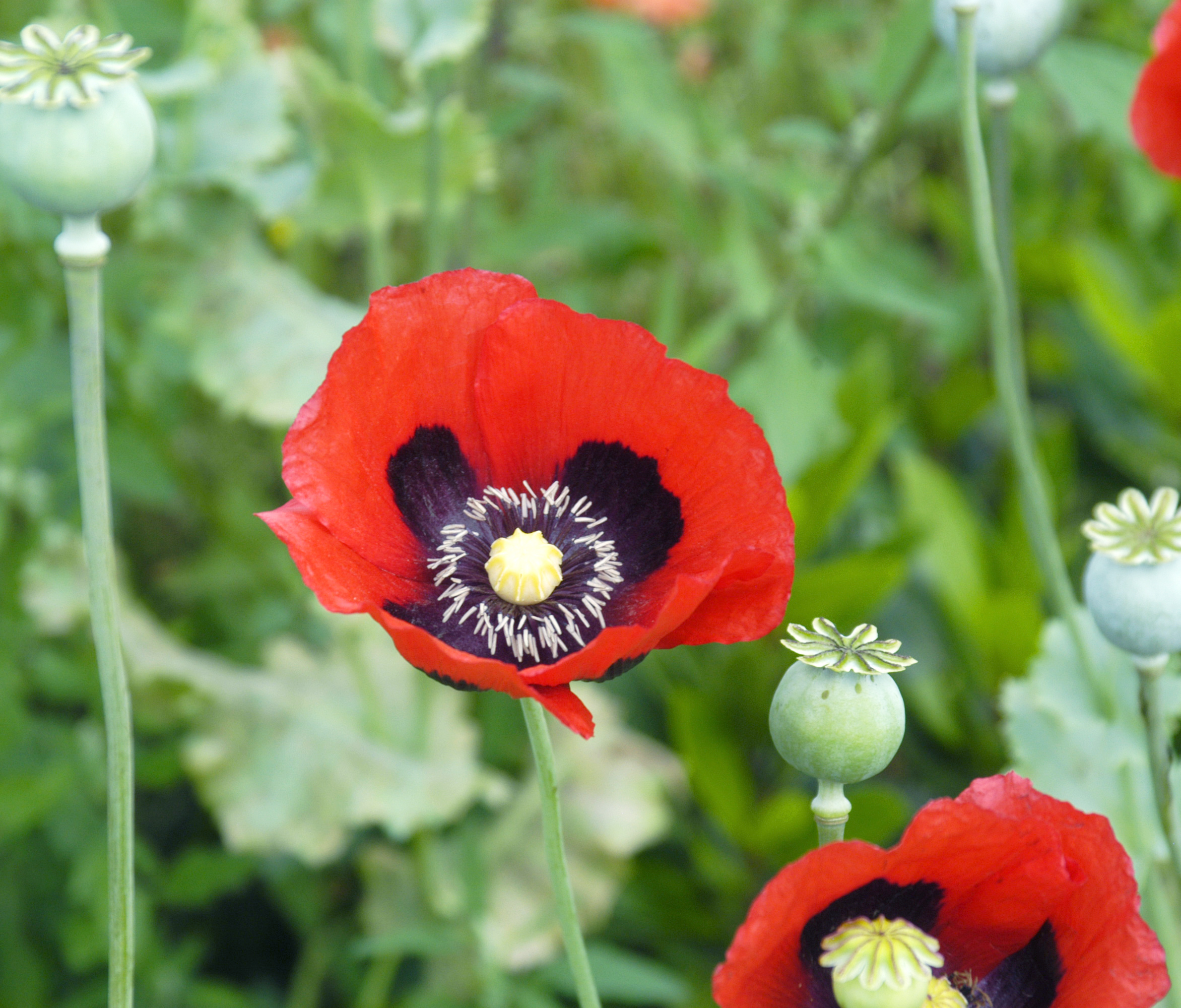
- Flowers and immature fruit

Scientific classification
- Kingdom: Plantae
- Clade: Tracheophytes
- Clade: Angiosperms
- Clade: Eudicots
- Order: Ranunculales
- Family: Papaveraceae
- Genus: Papaver
- Species: P. somniferum

Binomial name
- Papaver somniferum L.

= Papaver somniferum =

Opium poppy

Species of flowering plant in the poppy family

Papaver somniferum, commonly known as the opium poppy or breadseed poppy, is a species of flowering plant in the family Papaveraceae. It is the species of plant from which both opium and poppy seeds are derived and is also a valuable ornamental plant grown in gardens. Its native range is the western Mediterranean region, but has since been obscured by widespread introduction and cultivation since ancient times to the present day. It is now naturalised across much of the world with temperate climates.

== Description ==
Papaver somniferum is an annual herb growing to about 100 centimetres (40 inches) tall. The plant is strongly glaucous, giving a greyish-green appearance, and the stem and leaves bear a sparse distribution of coarse hairs. The large leaves are lobed, the upper stem leaves clasping the stem, the lowest leaves with a short petiole. The flowers are up to 8–18 cm (3–7 in) diameter, normally with four red, white, or mauve petals, often with a dark patch at the base of each petal. The fruit is a hairless, rounded capsule topped with 12–18 radiating stigmatic rays, or fluted cap. All parts of the plant exude white latex when wounded.

== Distribution and habitat ==
The native range of opium poppy is probably Macaronesia, W. & Central Mediterranean, but extensive cultivation and introduction of the species throughout Europe since ancient times have obscured its origin. It has escaped from cultivation, or has been introduced and become naturalised extensively in all regions of the British Isles, particularly in the south and east, with its seeds having been found in archaeological material dating back to the Bronze Age and in almost all other countries of the world with suitable, temperate climates.

== Taxonomy ==
Papaver somniferum was given its accepted name by the Swedish botanist Carl Linnaeus on page 508 of his Species Plantarum in 1753. It is classified in the genus Papaver within the larger family Papaveraceae. It has two accepted subspecies and one natural hybrid between them:

- Papaver somniferum nothosubsp. authemanii
  This natural hybrid is native to France. It was first described as a hybrid named Papaver × authemanii in 1893 and reclassified to its accepted name in 2012.
- Papaver somniferum subsp. setigerum
  This subspecies was first named Papaver setigerum in 1815 by Augustin Pyramus de Candolle. It was reclassified as a subspecies in 1882 by Giovanni Arcangeli. Its native range is North Africa from Morocco to Lybia and in southern Europe from Portugual to Italy.
- Papaver somniferum subsp. somniferum
  The autonymic subspecies is a cultigen, a plant that has been developed by human selection.

The opium poppy has 76 synonyms of its two subspecies and the hybrid.

Table of Synonyms
Name	Year	Rank	Synonym of:	Notes
Papaver album Mill.	1768	species	subsp. somniferum	= het.
Papaver album-nigrum Crantz	1763	species	subsp. somniferum	= het.
Papaver amoenum Lindl.	1839	species	subsp. somniferum	= het.
Papaver amplexicaule Stokes	1812	species	subsp. somniferum	= het.
Papaver apodocarpum Hussenot	1835	species	subsp. somniferum	= het.
Papaver × authemanii Rouy	1893	hybrid	nothosubsp. authemanii	≡ hom.
Papaver glabrum Gilib.	1782	species	subsp. somniferum	= het., opus utique oppr.
Papaver glaucum var. leucum Rothm.	1954	variety	subsp. somniferum	= het.
Papaver hortense Hussenot	1835	species	subsp. somniferum	= het.
Papaver hortense Garsault	1764	species	subsp. somniferum	= het., opus utique rej.
Papaver indehiscens Dumort.	1827	species	subsp. somniferum	= het.
Papaver nigrum Garsault	1764	species	subsp. somniferum	= het., opus utique rej.
Papaver nigrum (DC.) Ser.	1845	species	subsp. somniferum	= het.
Papaver officinale C.C.Gmel.	1806	species	subsp. somniferum	= het.
Papaver officinale var. monstrosum Göpp.	1851	variety	subsp. somniferum	= het.
Papaver opiiferum Forssk.	1775	species	subsp. somniferum	= het.
Papaver opiiferum var. album DC.	1821	variety	subsp. somniferum	= het.
Papaver paeoniiflorum (Alef.) Corrêa	1926	species	subsp. somniferum	= het.
Papaver polycephalum E.Vilm.	1863	species	subsp. somniferum	= het.
Papaver setigerum DC.	1815	species	subsp. setigerum	≡ hom.
Papaver setigerum var. muticum Regel	1856	variety	subsp. setigerum	= het.
Papaver setigerum var. nigrum (Garsault) P.Fourn.	1936	variety	subsp. somniferum	= het.
Papaver setigerum var. valdesetosum Maire	1935	variety	subsp. setigerum	= het.
Papaver somniferum var. album (Mill.) DC.	1821	variety	subsp. somniferum	= het.
Papaver somniferum f. album (Mill.) Kuntze	1887	form	subsp. somniferum	= het.
Papaver somniferum convar. album (Mill.) Alef.	1866	convariety	subsp. somniferum	= het.
Papaver somniferum var. apodocarpum (Hussenot) Alef.	1866	variety	subsp. somniferum	= het.
Papaver somniferum var. atroviolaceum Maire	1934	variety	subsp. setigerum	= het.
Papaver somniferum subvar. atroviolaceum (Maire) Maire	1964	subvariety	subsp. setigerum	= het.
Papaver somniferum var. austroviolaceum Vessel.	1975	variety	subsp. somniferum	= het.
Papaver somniferum var. caesium Alef.	1866	variety	subsp. somniferum	= het.
Papaver somniferum var. coccineum Maire	1932	variety	subsp. setigerum	= het.
Papaver somniferum var. dinocarpum Alef.	1866	variety	subsp. somniferum	= het.
Papaver somniferum f. dissectum Kuntze	1887	form	subsp. somniferum	= het.
Papaver somniferum convar. drogist (Basil. & Zhuk.) Vessel.	1975	convariety	subsp. somniferum	= het.
Papaver somniferum var. genuinovilaceum Vessel.	1975	variety	subsp. somniferum	= het.
Papaver somniferum var. glabrum Boiss.	1867	variety	subsp. somniferum	= het.
Papaver somniferum var. griseum Alef.	1866	variety	subsp. somniferum	= het.
Papaver somniferum var. haageanum Alef.	1866	variety	subsp. somniferum	= het.
Papaver somniferum subsp. hortense Arcang.	1882	subspecies	subsp. somniferum	= het.
Papaver somniferum subsp. hortense (Hussenot) Syme	1863	subspecies	subsp. somniferum	= het.
Papaver somniferum var. hortense (Hussenot) Alef.	1866	variety	subsp. somniferum	= het.
Papaver somniferum var. hortense (Hussenot) Rouy & Foucaud	1893	variety	subsp. somniferum	= het.
Papaver somniferum var. hussenotii Alef.	1866	variety	subsp. somniferum	= het.
Papaver somniferum convar. indicum Vessel.	1975	convariety	subsp. somniferum	= het., without type.
Papaver somniferum f. laciniatum Kuntze	1887	form	subsp. somniferum	= het.
Papaver somniferum var. leucum (Rothm.) K.Hammer	1987	variety	subsp. somniferum	= het.
Papaver somniferum var. luteum Alef.	1866	variety	subsp. somniferum	= het.
Papaver somniferum f. marginatum Kuntze	1887	form	subsp. somniferum	= het.
Papaver somniferum monstrosum Van Houtte ex T.Moore	1860		subsp. somniferum	= het.
Papaver somniferum subsp. nigrum Schübl. & G.Martens	1834	subspecies	subsp. somniferum	= het., nom. illeg.
Papaver somniferum subsp. nigrum (DC.) Thell.	1908	subspecies	subsp. somniferum	= het.
Papaver somniferum var. nigrum DC.	1821	variety	subsp. somniferum	= het.
Papaver somniferum f. nigrum (DC.) Kuntze	1887	form	subsp. somniferum	= het.
Papaver somniferum convar. nigrum (DC.) Alef.	1866	convariety	subsp. somniferum	= het.
Papaver somniferum subsp. officinale (C.C.Gmel.) Bonnier & Layens	1894	subspecies	subsp. somniferum	= het.
Papaver somniferum var. officinale (C.C.Gmel.) Alef.	1866	variety	subsp. somniferum	= het.
Papaver somniferum proles officinale (C.C.Gmel.) Rouy & Foucaud	1893	proles	subsp. somniferum	= het.
Papaver somniferum convar. opiiferum (Forssk.) Vessel.	1975	convariety	subsp. somniferum	= het.
Papaver somniferum subsp. opiiferum (Forssk.) Juel, Cedergr. & Örtendahl	1914	subspecies	subsp. somniferum	= het.
Papaver somniferum var. paeoniiflorum Alef.	1866	variety	subsp. somniferum	= het.
Papaver somniferum f. poecilospermum (Alef.) Kuntze	1887	form	subsp. somniferum	= het.
Papaver somniferum convar. poecilospermum Alef.	1866	convariety	subsp. somniferum	= het.
Papaver somniferum var. pullatum Vessel.	1975	variety	subsp. somniferum	= het.
Papaver somniferum var. quassandum Alef.	1866	variety	subsp. somniferum	= het.
Papaver somniferum var. roseum Alef.	1866	variety	subsp. somniferum	= het.
Papaver somniferum var. rubellum Vessel.	1975	variety	subsp. somniferum	= het.
Papaver somniferum var. setigerum (DC.) Webb & Berthel.	1836	variety	subsp. setigerum	≡ hom.
Papaver somniferum proles setigerum (DC.) Rouy & Foucaud	1893	proles	subsp. setigerum	≡ hom.
Papaver somniferum var. stipitatum (Hussenot) Alef.	1866	variety	subsp. somniferum	= het.
Papaver somniferum convar. tarbagataicum (Basil.) Vessel.	1975	convariety	subsp. somniferum	= het.
Papaver somniferum f. tricolor Kuntze	1887	form	subsp. somniferum	= het.
Papaver somniferum var. valdesetosum (Maire) Maire	1964	variety	subsp. setigerum	= het.
Papaver somniferum var. violiflorum Vessel.	1975	variety	subsp. somniferum	= het.
Papaver stipitatum Hussenot	1835	species	subsp. somniferum	= het.
Papaver sylvestre Godr.	1854	species	subsp. somniferum	= het.
Notes: ≡ homotypic synonym ; = heterotypic synonym

== Uses ==
This poppy is grown as an agricultural crop on a large scale, for one of three primary purposes; to produce poppy seeds, to produce opium for use mainly by the pharmaceutical industry, and to produce other alkaloids (mainly thebaine and oripavine) that are processed by pharmaceutical companies into drugs such as hydrocodone and oxycodone. Each of these goals has special breeds that are targeted at one of these businesses, and breeding efforts (including biotechnological ones) are continually underway. A comparatively small amount of P. somniferum seed is also produced commercially for ornamental purposes.

Today many cultivars have been bred that do not produce a significant quantity of opium. The cultivar 'Sujata' produces no latex at all. This differentiation has strong implications for legal policy surrounding the growing of the plant.

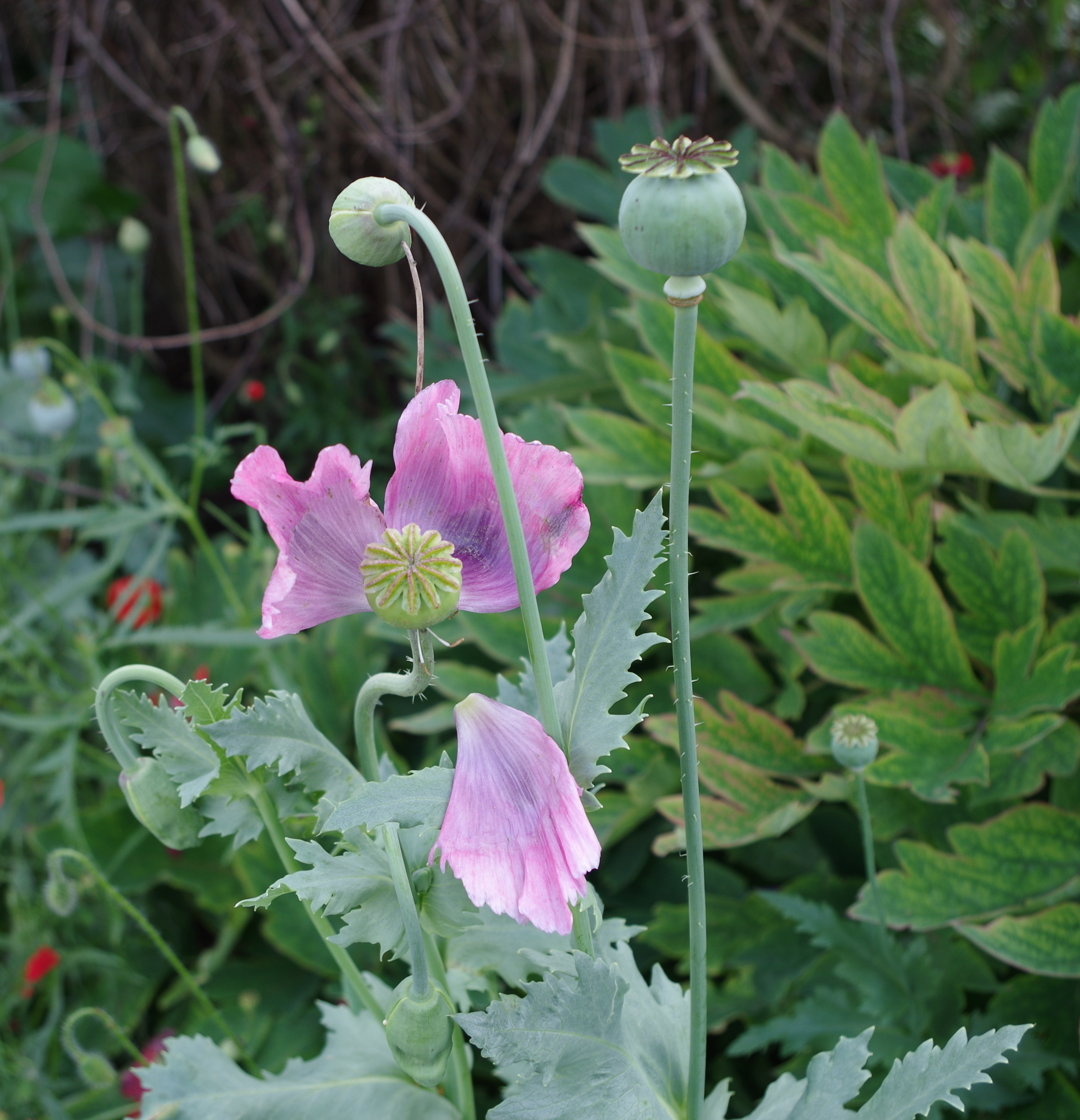
Plant showing the typical glaucous appearance

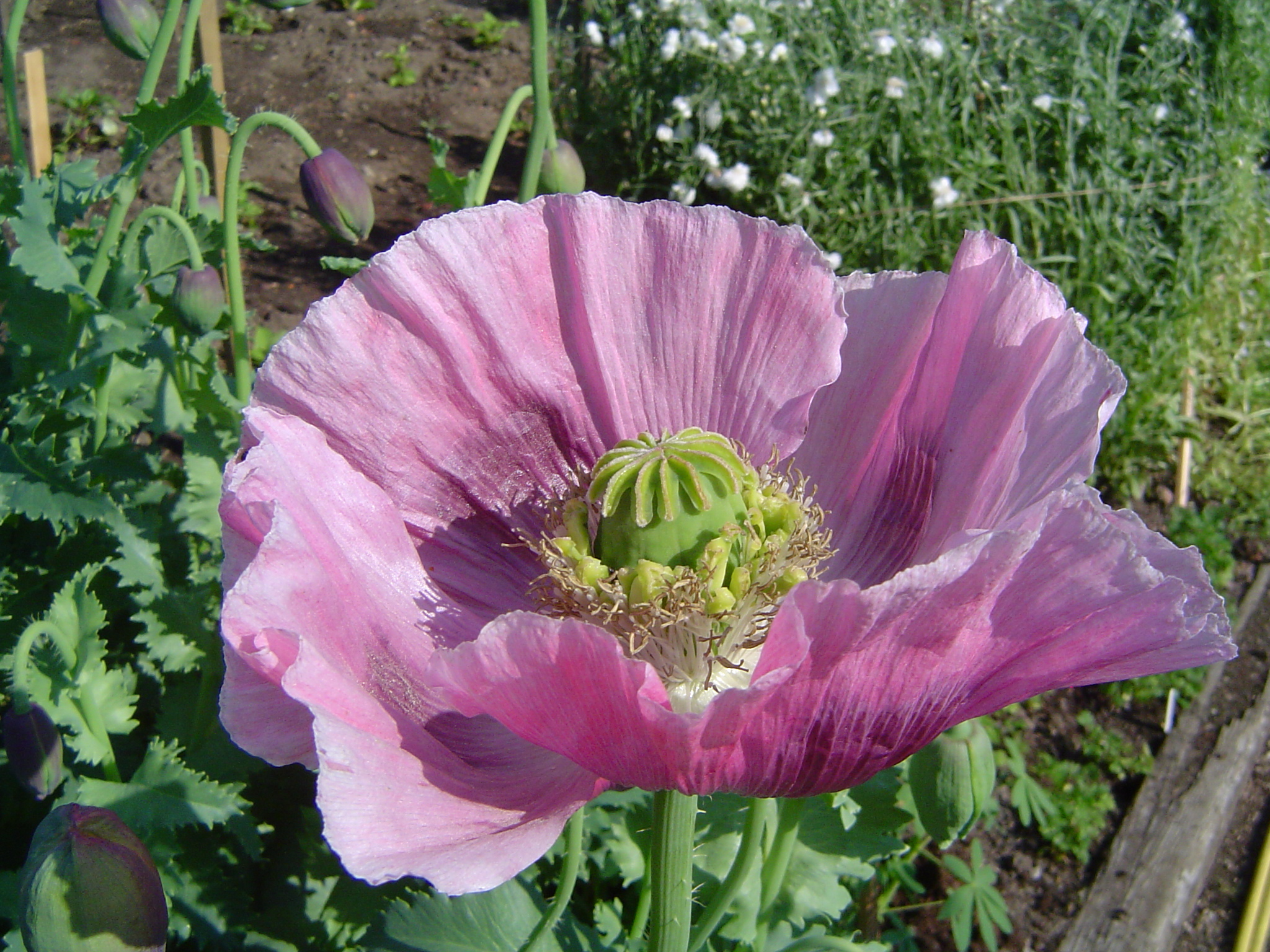
Flower

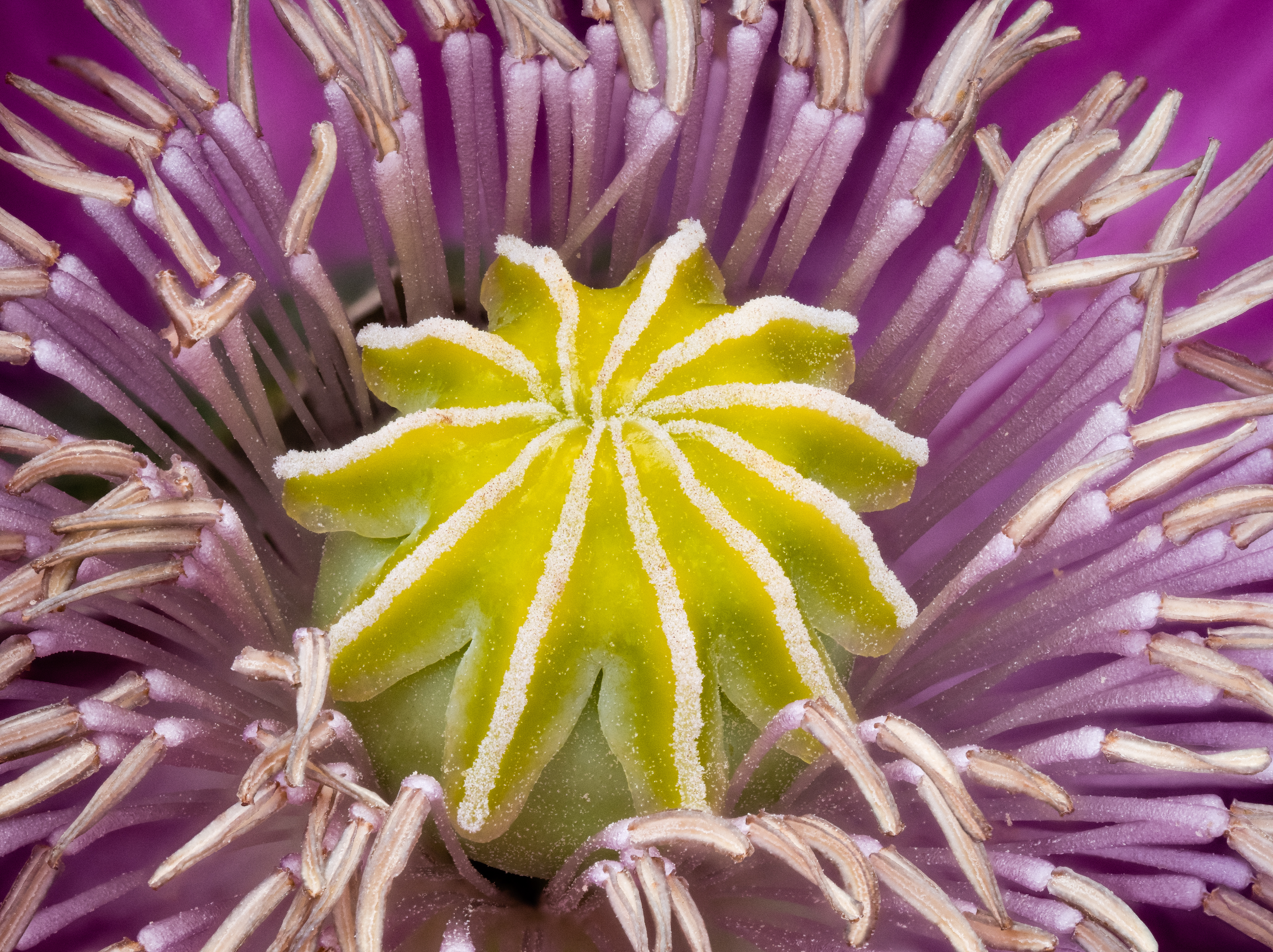
Close-up of the centre of a flower

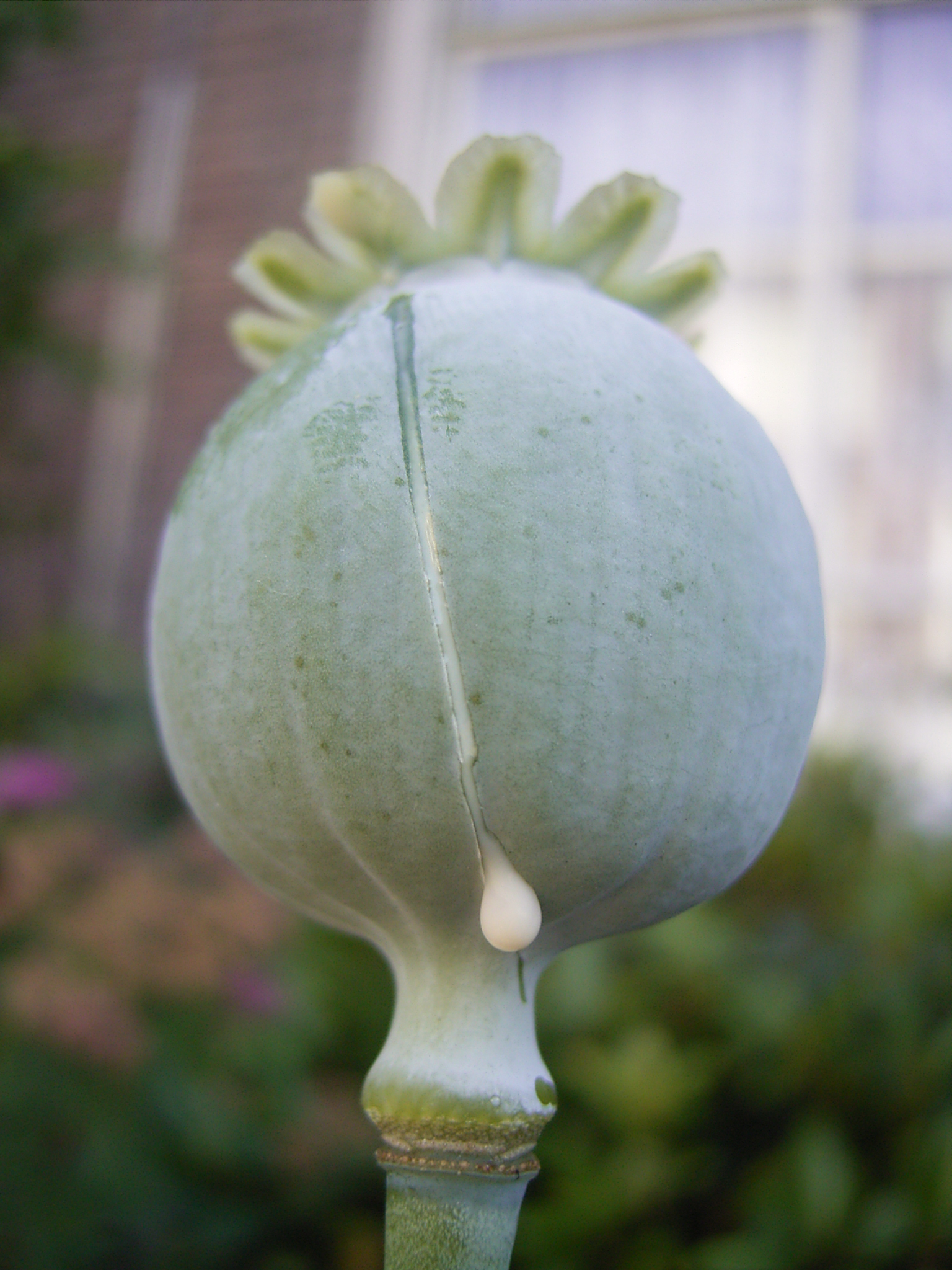
Capsule showing latex (opium) exuding from incision

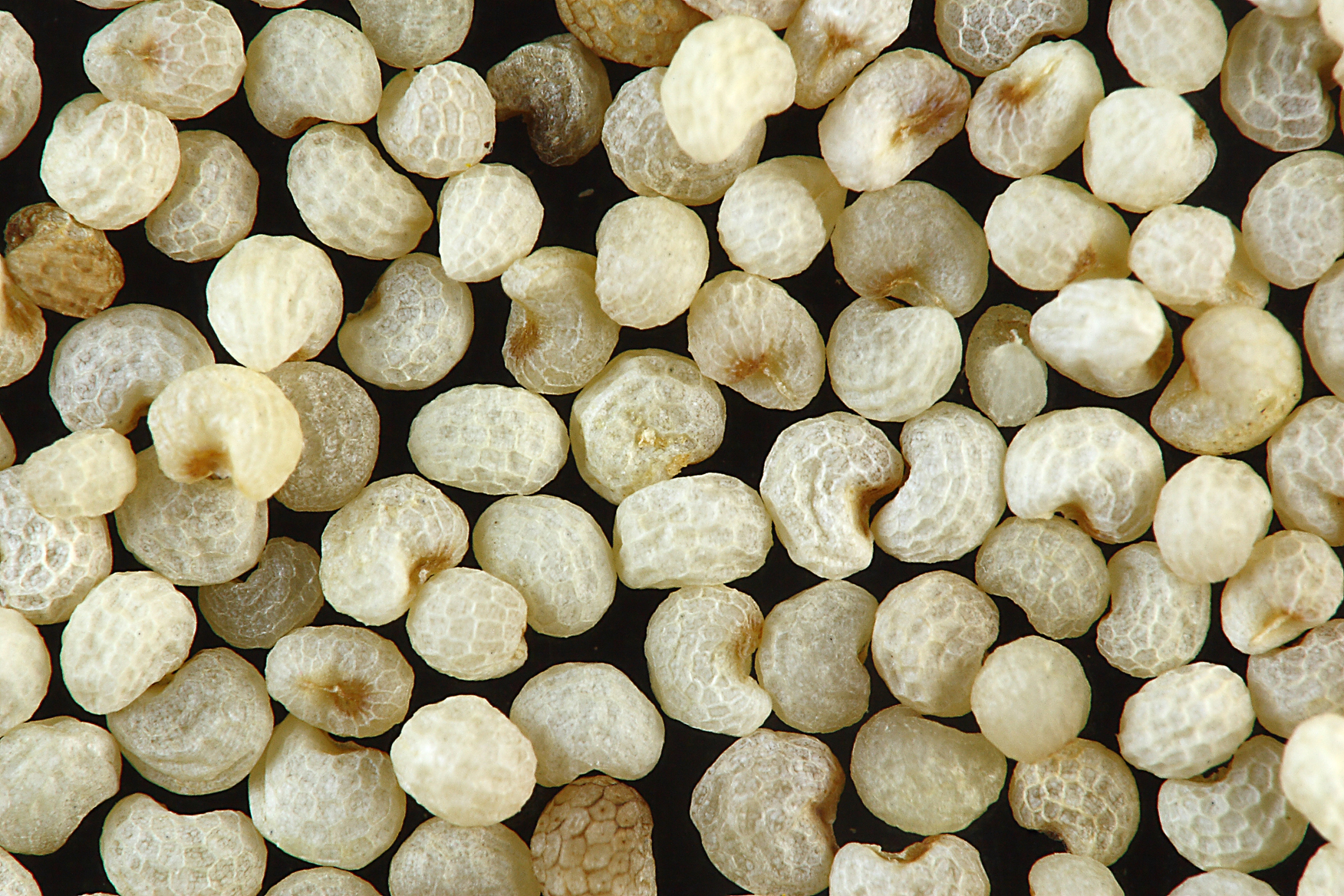
Close-up of white poppy seeds

== Biology ==
=== Metabolism ===
The alkaloids are organic nitrogenous compounds, derivatives of secondary metabolism, synthesised through the metabolic pathway of benzylisoquinoline. First, the amino acid phenylalanine, through the enzyme phenylalanine hydroxylase, is transformed into tyrosine. Tyrosine can follow two different routes: by tyrosine hydroxylase it can form L-dopamine (L-DOPA), or it can be reduced to form 4-phenylhydroxyacetaldehyde (4-HPAA). Subsequently, L-DOPA reacts with 4-HPAA and, through a series of reactions, forms (S) -norcoclaurine, which carries the benzylisoquinoline skeleton that gives its name to this pathway. The conversion of (S) -norcoclaurin to (S) -reticuline is one of the key points, since from (S) -reticuline morphine can be formed through the morphinan route, noscapine through the path of the noscapina or berberina.

=== Genome ===
The poppy genome contains 51,213 genes encoding proteins distributed 81.6% in 11 individual chromosomes and 18.4% remaining in unplaced scaffolds. In addition, 70.9% of the genome is made up of repetitive elements, of which the most represented are the long terminal repeat retrotransposons. This enrichment of genes is related to the maintenance of homeostasis and a positive regulation of transcription.

The analysis of synergy of the opium poppy reveals traces of segmental duplications 110 million years ago (MYA), before the divergence between Papaveraceae and Ranunculaceae, and an event of duplication of the complete genome makes 7.8 MYA.

The genes are possibly grouped as follows:

- The genes responsible for the conversion of (S) -reticuline to noscapine are found on chromosome 11.
- The genes responsible for the conversion of (S) -reticuline to thebaine are found on chromosome 11.
- The genes responsible for the conversion of thebaine are found in chromosome 1, chromosome 2, chromosome 7, and perhaps others.

=== Cultivars ===
P. somniferum has had a very long tradition of use, starting in the Neolithic. This long period of time allowed the development of a broad range of different forms. In total there are 52 botanical varieties. Breeding of P. somniferum faces a challenge caused by the contradictory breeding goals for this species. On one hand a very high content of alkaloids is requested for medical uses. Global demand for the alkaloids and their pharmaceutical derivatives has increased in recent years. Therefore, there is a need for the development of cultivars with a high opium yield. On the other hand, the food industry demands alkaloid contents be as low as possible.

There are also many ornamental cultivars selected for colour or number of their petals or other characteristics. There are double-flowered cultivars, often called peony flowered or 'paeoniflorum' in a range of colours. There are even varieties selected for the shape of their pods such as 'Hen and Chickens' with smaller pods around a larger central pod.

== Ecology ==
=== Diseases ===
P. somniferum is susceptible to several fungal, insect and virus infections including seed borne diseases such as downy mildew and root rot. The use of pesticides in combination to cultural methods have been considered as major control measures for various poppy diseases.

The fungal pathogen Peronospora arborescens, the causal agent of downy mildew, occurs preferentially during wet and humid conditions. This oomycete penetrates the roots through oospores and infects the leaves as conidia in a secondary infection. The fungus causes hypertrophy and curvature of the stem and flower stalks. The symptoms are chlorosis and curling of the affected tissues with necrotic spots. The leaf under-surface is covered with a downy mildew coating containing conidiospores that spread the infection further leading to plant damage and death. Another downy mildew species, Peronospora somniferi, produces systemic infections leading to stunting and deformation of poppy plants. Downy mildew can be controlled preventively at the initial stage of seed development through several fungicide applications.

Leaf blight caused by the fungus Helminthosporium papaveris is one of the most destructive poppy diseases worldwide. The seed-borne fungus causes root rot in young plants and stunted stems in plants at a higher development stage, where leaf spots appear on the leaves and is being transmitted to capsules and seeds. Early sowing of seeds and deep plowing of poppy residues can reduce fungal inoculum during the plant growing season in the following year on neighboring poppy stocks, respectively.

Mosaic diseases in P. somniferum are caused by rattle virus and the Carlavirus. In 2006, a novel virus tentatively called "opium poppy mosaic virus" (OPMV) from the genus Umbravirus was isolated from P. somniferum containing leaf mosaic and mottling symptoms, in New Zealand.

=== Pests ===
There are only a few pests that can do harm to P. somniferum.

Flea beetles perforate the leaves of young plants and aphids suck on the sap of the flower buds. The poppy root weevil (Stenocarus ruficornis) is another significant pest. The insect lives in the soil and migrates in spring to the poppy fields after crop emergence. Adults damage the leaves of small plants by eating them. Female lay their eggs into the tissue of lower leaves. Insect larvae hatch and burrow into the soil to complete their life cycle on the poppy roots as adults.

== Cultivation ==
In the growth development of P. somniferum, six stages can be distinguished. The growth development starts with the growth of the seedlings. In a second step the rosette-type leaves and stalks are formed. After that budding (hook stage) takes place as a third step. The hook stage is followed by flowering. Subsequently, technical maturity is reached, which means that the plant is ready for cutting. The last step is biological maturity; dry seeds are ripened. The photoperiod seems to be the main determinant of flower development of P. somniferum.

P. somniferum shows a very slow development in the beginning of its vegetation period. Due to this fact the competition of weeds is very high in early stages. It is very important to control weeds effectively in the first 50 days after sowing. Additionally, Papaver somniferum is rather susceptible to herbicides. The pre-emergence application of the herbicide chlortoluron has been shown to be effective in reducing weed levels. However, in the last decade the weed management of Papaver somniferum has shifted from pre-emergence treatments to post-emergence treatments. Especially, the application of the two herbicides mesotrione and tembotrione has become very popular. The combined application of those two herbicides has been shown to be recommendable for effective weed management in Papaver somniferum. Sowing time (autumn or spring), preceding crop and soil texture are important variables influencing the weed species composition. A highly abundant weed species in Papaver somniferum fields was shown to be Papaver rhoeas. Papaver somniferum and Papaver rhoeas are congeners and belong to the same plant family, which impedes the chemical control of this weed species. Therefore, weed management represents a big challenge and requires technological knowledge from the farmer. In order to increase the efficiency of weed control not only chemical weed control should be applied but also mechanical weed control.

For P. somniferum, a growth density of 70 to 80 plants per square metre is recommended. Latex-to-biomass yield is greatest under conditions of slight water deficit.

=== As an ornamental plant ===
Live plants and seeds of the opium poppy are widely sold by seed companies and nurseries in most of the western world, including the United States. Poppies are sought after by gardeners for the vivid colour of the flowers, the hardiness and reliability of the poppy plants, the exotic chocolate-vegetal fragrance note of some cultivars, and the ease of growing the plants from purchased flats of seedlings or by direct sowing of the seed. Poppy seed pods are also sold for dried flower arrangements.

Though "opium poppy and poppy straw" are listed in Schedule II of the United States' Controlled Substances Act, P. somniferum can be grown legally in the United States as a seed crop or as an ornamental plant. During the summer, opium poppies can be seen flowering in gardens throughout North America and Europe, and displays are found in many private plantings, as well as in public botanical and museum gardens such as United States Botanical Garden, Missouri Botanical Garden, and North Carolina Botanical Garden.

Many countries grow the plants, and some rely heavily on the commercial production of the drug as a major source of income. As an additional source of profit, the seeds of the same plants are sold for use in foods, so the cultivation of the plant is a significant source of income. This international trade in seeds of P. somniferum was addressed by a UN resolution "to fight the international trade in illicit opium poppy seeds" on 28 July 1998.

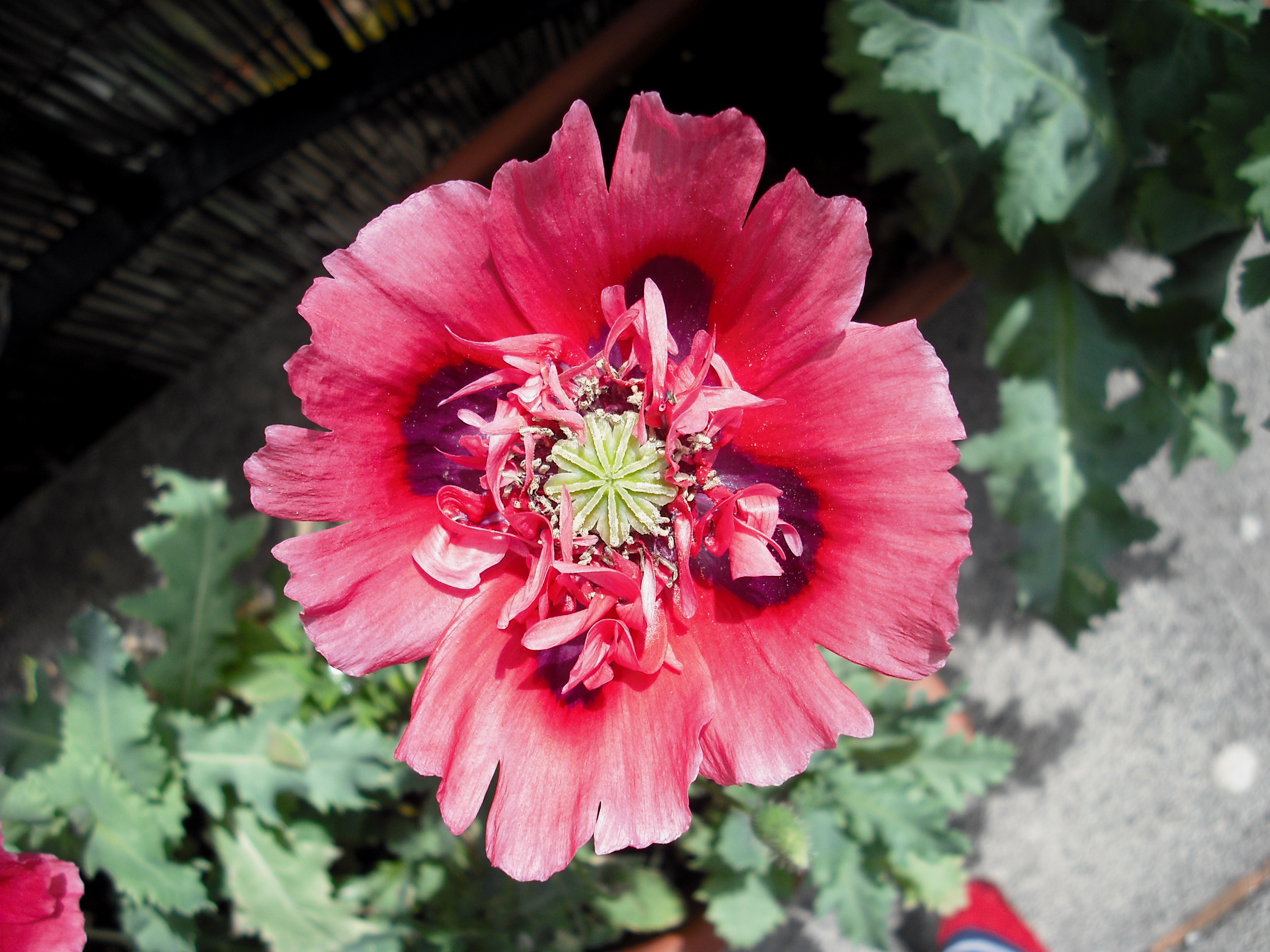
Red opium poppy flower

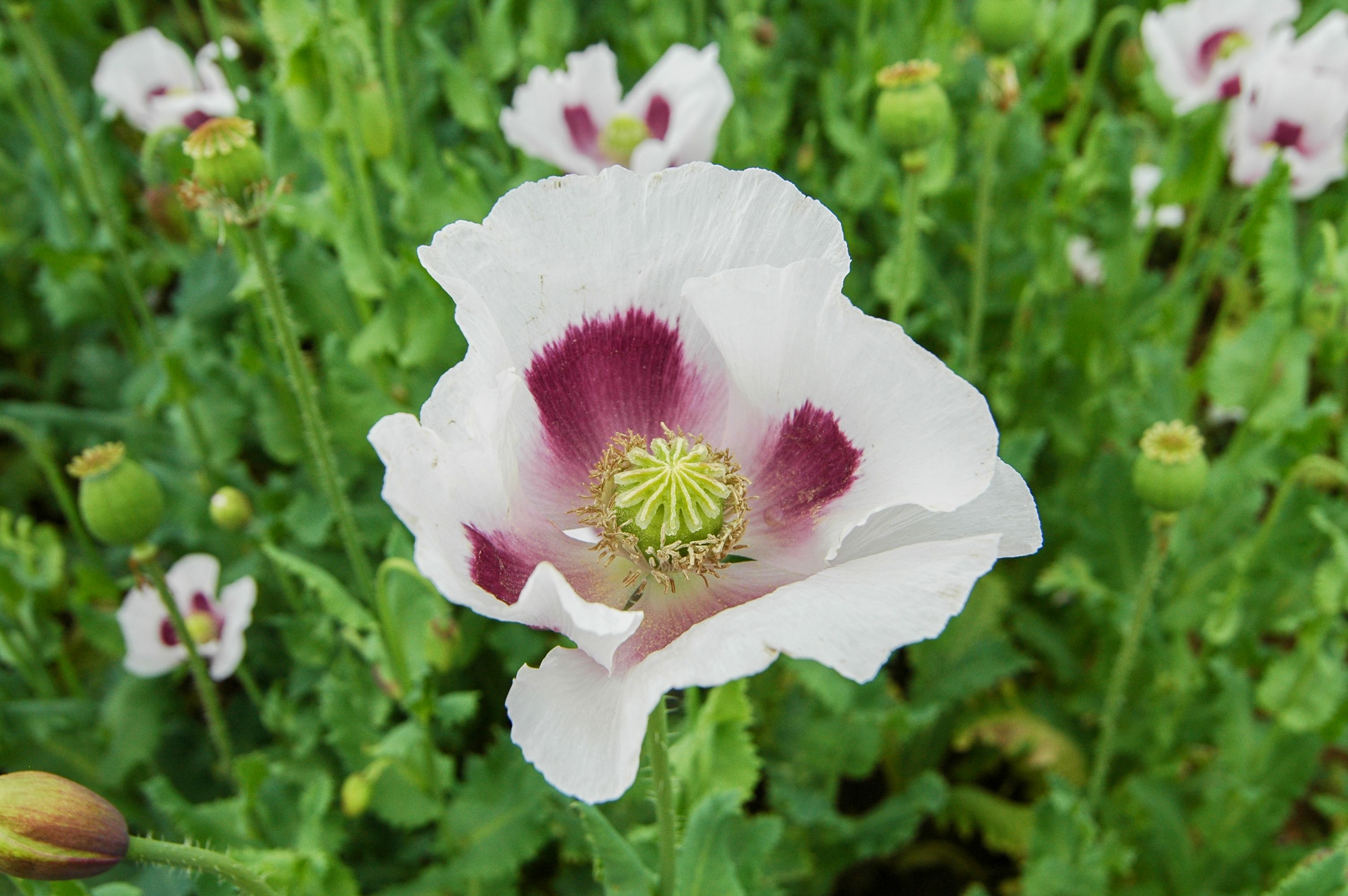
Czech blue poppy flower

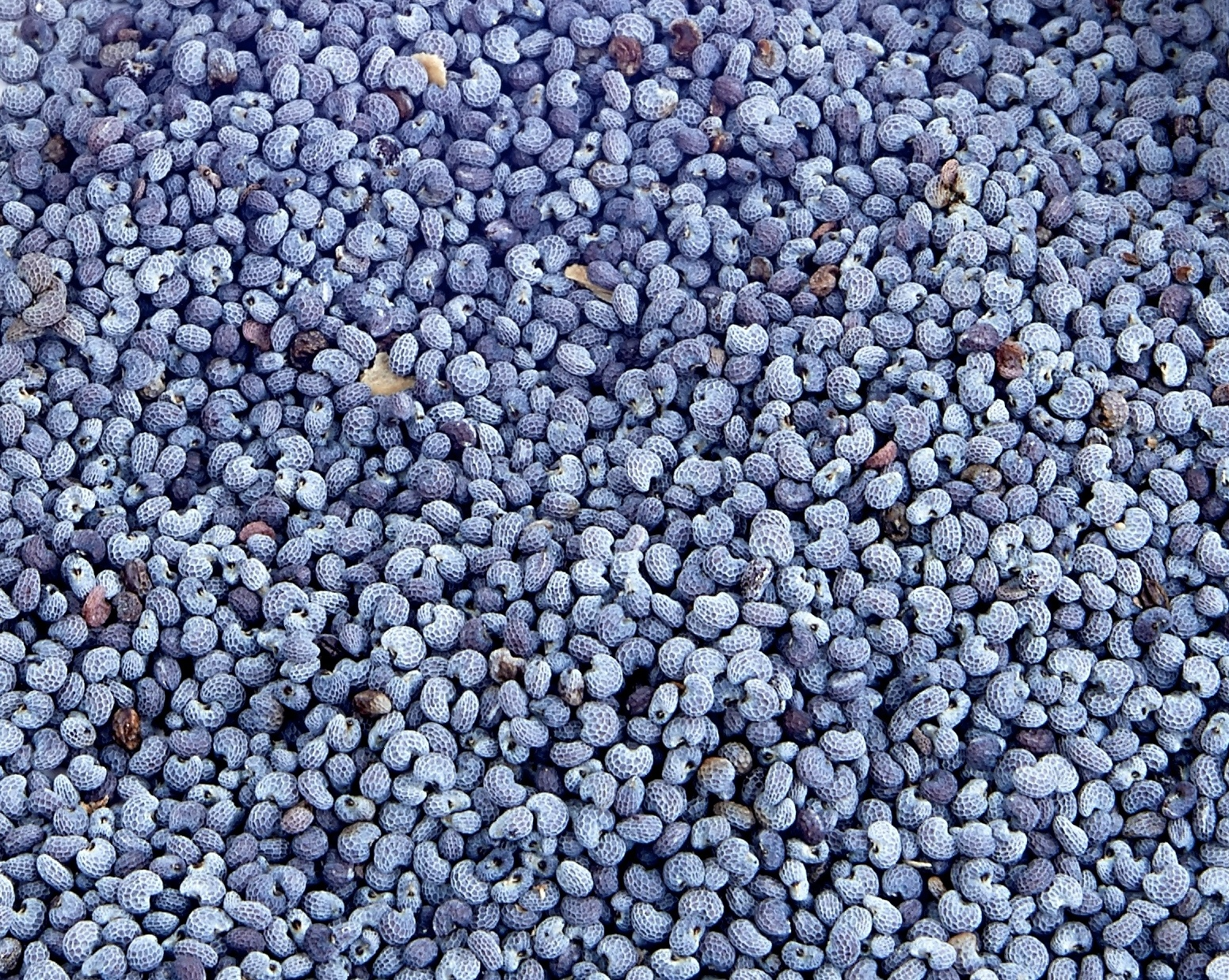
Czech blue poppy seeds

=== Production ===
Poppy seed production – 2018
Country	(tonnes)
Turkey	26,991
Czech Republic	13,666
Spain	12,360
World	76,240
Source: FAOSTAT of the United Nations

==== Food ====
In 2018, world production of poppy seeds for consumption was 76,240 tonnes, led by Turkey with 35% of the world total (table). Poppy seed production and trade are susceptible to fluctuations mainly due to unstable yields. The performance of most genotypes of Papaver somniferum is very susceptible to environmental changes. This behaviour led to a stagnation of the poppy seed market value between 2008 and 2009 as a consequence of high stock levels, bad weather and poor quality. The world leading importer of poppy seed is India (16 000 tonnes), followed by Russia, Poland and Germany.

Poppy seed oil remains a niche product due to the lower yield compared to conventional oil crops.

==== Medicine ====
Australia (Tasmania), Turkey and India are the major producers of poppy for medicinal purposes and poppy-based drugs, such as morphine or codeine. The New York Times reported, in 2014, that Tasmania was the largest producer of the poppy cultivars used for thebaine (85% of the world's supply) and oripavine (100% of the world's supply) production. Tasmania also had 25% of the world's opium and codeine production.

=== Restrictions ===
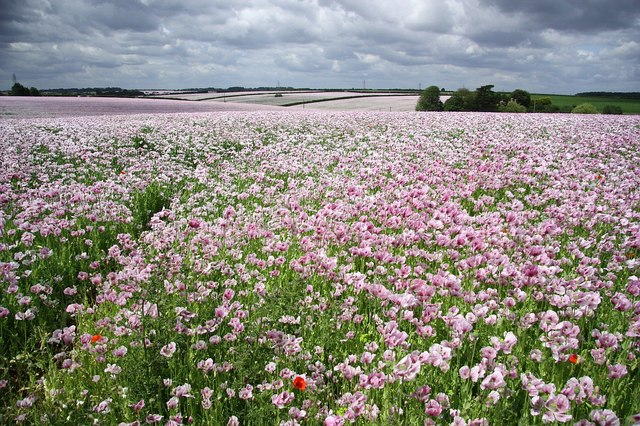
Opium poppy fields near Metheringham, Lincolnshire, England. Also visible in the field are red field poppies, another related species of poppy which often grows alongside P. somniferum as a weed

In most of Central and Eastern Europe, poppy seed is commonly used for traditional pastries and cakes, and it is legal to grow poppies throughout the region, although Germany requires a license.

Since January 1999 in the Czech Republic, according to the 167/1998 Sb. Addictive Substances Act, poppies growing in fields larger than 100 square metres (120 sq yd) is obliged for reporting to the local Custom Office. Extraction of opium from the plants is prohibited by law (§ 15 letter d/ of the act). It is also prohibited to grow varieties with more than 0.8% of morphine in dry matter of their capsules, excluding research and experimental purposes (§24/1b/ of the act). The name Czech blue poppy refers to blue poppy seeds used for food.

The United Kingdom does not require a license for opium poppy cultivation, but does for extracting opium for medicinal products.

When the European Union attempted to ban the cultivation of Papaver somniferum by private individuals on a small scale (such as personal gardens), citizens in EU countries where poppy seed is eaten heavily, such as countries in the Central-Eastern region, strongly resisted the plan, causing the EU to change course.

In the United States, opium poppies and poppy straw are prohibited. As the opium poppy is legal for culinary or aesthetic reasons, poppies were once grown as a cash crop by farmers in California. The law of poppy cultivation in the United States is somewhat ambiguous. The reason for the ambiguity is that the Opium Poppy Control Act of 1942 (now repealed) stated that any opium poppies should be declared illegal, except if the farmers were issued a state permit. § 3 of the Opium Poppy Control Act stated:

It shall be unlawful for any person who is not the holder of a license authorizing him to produce the opium poppy, duly issued to him by the Secretary of the Treasury in accordance with the provisions of this Act, to produce the opium poppy, or to permit the production of the opium poppy in or upon any place owned, occupied, used, or controlled by him.

This led to the Poppy Rebellion, and to the Narcotics Bureau arresting anyone planting opium poppies and forcing the destruction of poppy fields of anyone who defied the prohibition of poppy cultivation. Though the press of those days favoured the Federal Bureau of Narcotics, the state of California supported the farmers who grew opium poppies for their seeds for uses in foods such as poppy seed muffins. Today, this area of law has remained vague and remains somewhat controversial in the United States. The Opium Poppy Control Act of 1942 was repealed on 27 October 1970.

Under the Federal Controlled Substances Act, opium poppy and poppy straw are listed as Schedule II drugs under ACSN 9630. Most (all?) states also use this classification under the uniform penal code. Possession of a Schedule II drug is a federal and state felony.

Canada forbids possessing, seeking or obtaining the opium poppy (Papaver somniferum), its preparations, derivatives, alkaloids and salts, although an exception is made for poppy seed.

In some parts of Australia, P. somniferum is illegal to cultivate, but in Tasmania, about 50% of the world supply is cultivated.

In New Zealand, it is legal to cultivate the opium poppy as long as it is not used to produce controlled drugs.

Singapore, UAE, and Saudi Arabia are among nations that ban even having poppy seeds, not just growing the plants for them. In United Arab Emirates the cultivation of the opium poppy is illegal, as is possession of poppy seed. At least one man has been imprisoned for possessing poppy seed obtained from a bread roll. The UAE has a long prison sentence for anyone possessing poppy seeds.

Myanmar bans cultivation in certain provinces. In northern Myanmar bans have ended a century-old tradition of growing the opium poppy. Between 20,000 and 30,000 former poppy farmers left the Kokang region as a result of the ban in 2002. People from the Wa region, where the ban was implemented in 2005, fled to areas where growing opium is still possible.

In South Korea, the cultivation of the opium poppy is strictly prohibited.

== History ==
Use of the opium poppy predates written history. The making and use of opium was known to the ancient Minoans. Its sap was later named opion by the ancient Greeks. The English name is based on the Latin adaptation of the Greek form. Evidence of the early domestication of opium poppy has been discovered through small botanical remains found in regions of the Mediterranean and west of the Rhine River, predating circa 5000 BC. These samples found in various Neolithic sites show the incredibly early cultivation and natural spread of the plant throughout western Europe.

Opium was used for treating asthma, stomach illnesses, and bad eyesight.

Opium became a major colonial commodity, moving legally and illegally through trade networks on the Indian subcontinent, the Colonial United States, Qing China and others. Members of the East India Company saw the opium trade as an investment opportunity beginning in 1683. In 1773, the Governor of Bengal established a monopoly on the production of Bengal opium, on behalf of the East India Company administration. The cultivation and manufacture of Indian opium was further centralised and controlled through a series of acts issued between 1797 and 1949. East India Company merchants balanced an economic deficit from the importation of Chinese tea by selling Indian opium which was smuggled into China in defiance of Qing government bans. This trade led to the First and Second Opium Wars.

Many modern writers, particularly in the 19th century, wrote on the opium poppy and its effects, notably Thomas de Quincey in Confessions of an English Opium Eater.

The French Romantic composer Hector Berlioz used opium for inspiration, subsequently producing his Symphonie Fantastique. In this work, a young artist overdoses on opium and experiences a series of visions of his unrequited love.

In the United States, Papaver somniferum was grown as an ornamental in the restored flower gardens at Thomas Jefferson's Monticello, where Jefferson's gardeners had planted it in the early 19th century, and the estate's Thomas Jefferson Center for Historic Plants sold its seeds. In April 1991, after local press inquiries that followed a drug bust at the University of Virginia, the Drug Enforcement Administration said it had no plans to charge Monticello officials for growing the flowers. Monticello's staff nonetheless removed the plants in June 1991 and stopped selling the seeds.

=== Poppy seeds and oil ===
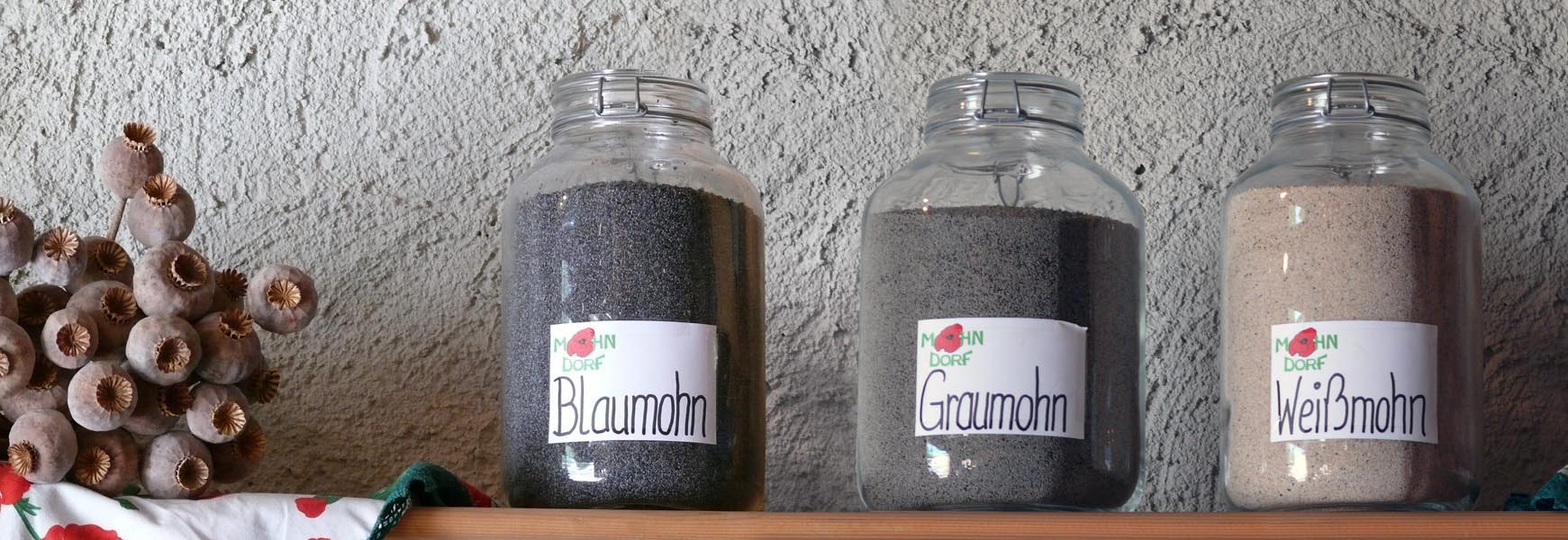
Dried blue, grey and white poppy seeds used for pastries in Germany

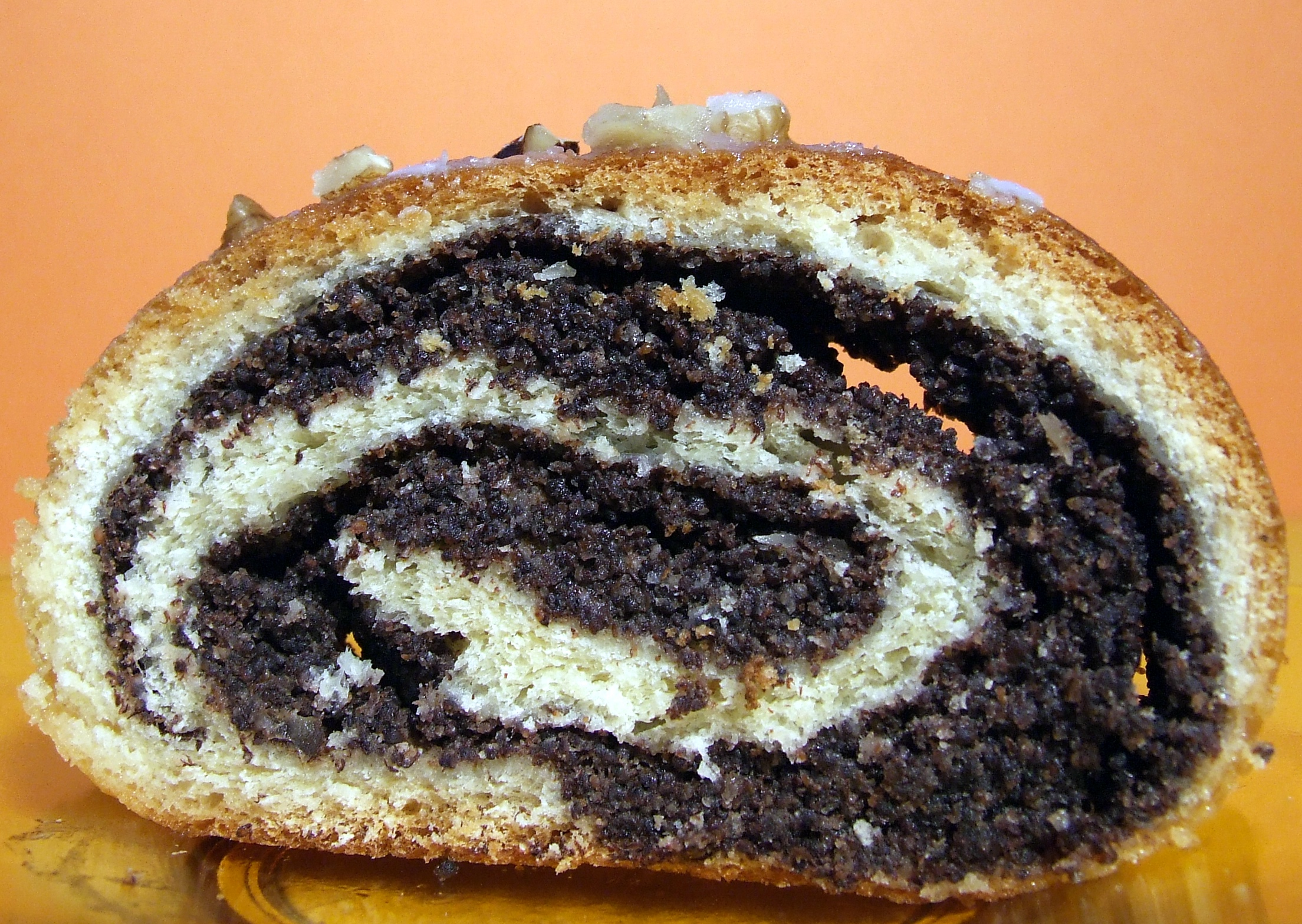
Polish makowiec, a nut roll filled with poppy seed paste

Poppy seeds from Papaver somniferum are an important food item and the source of poppy seed oil, an edible oil that has many uses. The seeds contain very low levels of opiates and the oil extracted from them contains even less. Both the oil and the seed residue also have commercial uses.

The poppy press cake as a residue of the oil pressing can be used as fodder for different animals such as cattle. Especially in the time of the molt of poultry and fancy fowls, the cake is nutritive and fits to their special needs. Next to the animal fodder, poppy offers other by-products. For example, the stem of the plant can be used for energy briquettes and pellets to heat.

Poppy seeds are used as a food in many cultures. They may be used whole by bakers to decorate their products or milled and mixed with sugar as a sweet filling. They have a creamy and nut-like flavour, and when used with ground coconut, the seeds provide a unique and flavour-rich curry base. They can be dry roasted and ground to be used in wet curry (curry paste) or dry curry.

=== Opiates ===
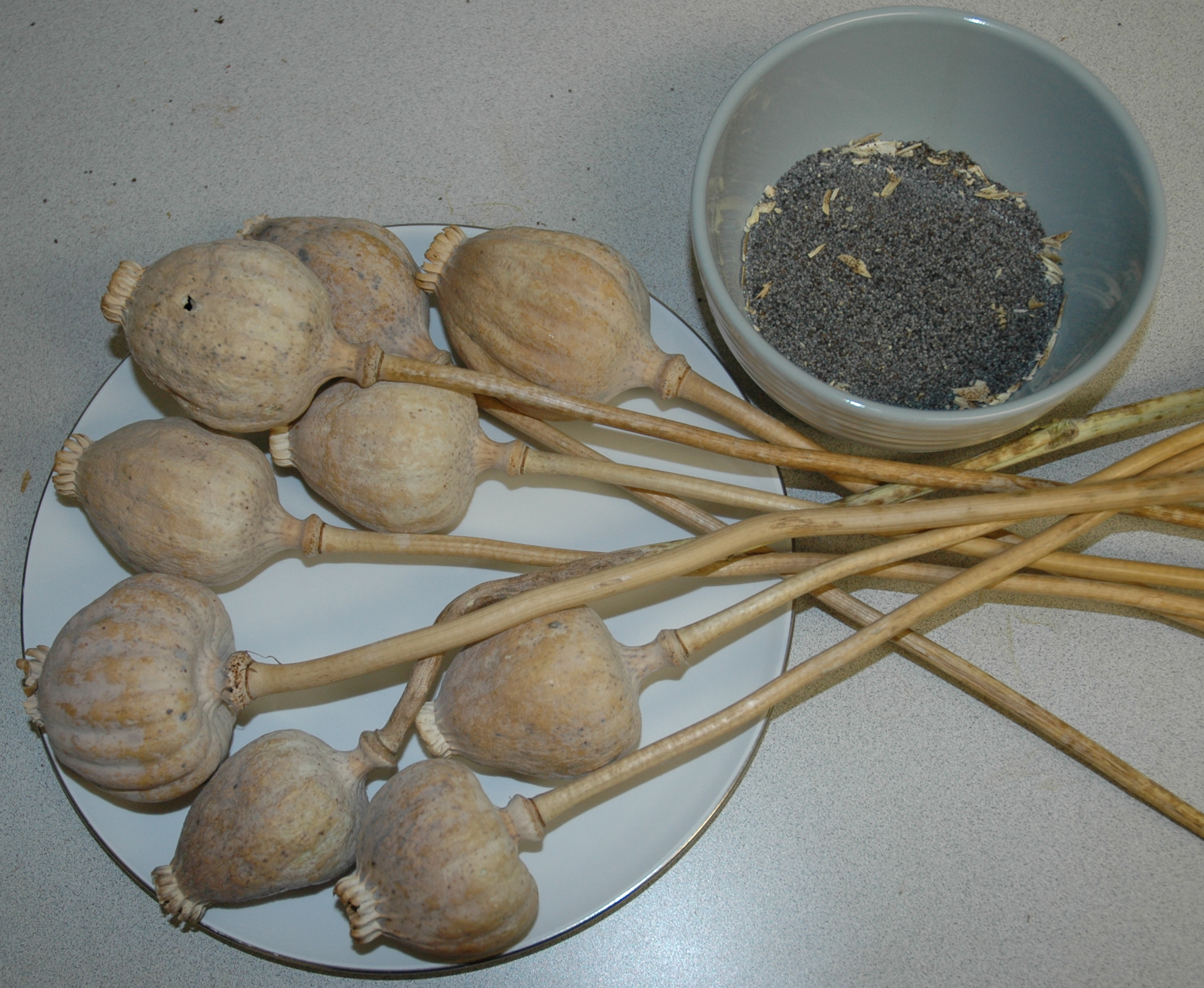
Dried poppy seed pods and stems (plate), and seeds (bowl)

The opium poppy is the principal source of opium, the dried latex produced by the seed pods. Opium contains a class of naturally occurring alkaloids known as opiates, that include morphine, codeine, thebaine, oripavine, papaverine and noscapine. The specific epithet somniferum means "sleep-bringing", referring to the sedative properties of some of these opiates.

The opiate drugs are extracted from opium. The latex oozes from incisions made on the green seed pods and is collected once dry. Tincture of opium or laudanum, consisting of opium dissolved in alcohol or a mixture of alcohol and water, is one of many unapproved drugs regulated by the U.S. Food and Drug Administration (FDA). Its marketing and distribution persists because its historical use preceded the Federal Food, Drug & Cosmetic Act of 1938. Tincture of opium B.P., containing 1% w/v of anhydrous morphine, also remains in the British Pharmacopoeia, listed as a Class A substance under the Misuse of Drugs Act 1971.

Morphine is the predominant alkaloid found in the cultivated varieties of opium poppy that are used for opium production. Other varieties produce minimal opium or none at all, such as the latex-free Sujata type. Non-opium cultivars that are planted for drug production feature a high level of thebaine or oripavine. Those are refined into drugs like oxycodone. Raw opium contains about 8–14% morphine by dry weight, or more in high-yield cultivars. It is used directly and, or, as the isolated natural opioids morphine, codeine, papaverine, thebaine, and, or, to produce semi-synthetic opioids such as buprenorphine, diamorphine (heroin), dihydromorphine and oxycodone.

== Culture ==
Opium poppies (flower and fruit) appear on the coat of arms of the Royal College of Anaesthetists.

=== Literature ===
Sea of Poppies, a fictional novel by Amitav Ghosh uses the opium poppy as a central theme throughout the narrative, with a main setting of the poppy fields of the Ganges River Plain.
