= Opium replacement =

Process of substituting opium with non-narcotic alternatives

Opium replacement or opium substitution refers to the process of substituting opium poppy cash crops with non-narcotic alternatives.

== Concept ==
The concept of opium replacement was first developed within an agricultural framework, most notably in Thailand. Agricultural engineers sought to identify crops that would generate more income than the opium poppy. In the late 1970s and early 1980s, rural development projects caused the terms opium replacement and opium substitution to be superseded by integrated rural development. In the 1990s, the term shifted to alternative development. This term and its minor variants are still used in Latin America (where crop-replacement approaches are used for coca). The United Nations refers to these crop replacement projects as sustainable alternative livelihoods; in Afghanistan, development agencies use the term sustainable livelihoods.

== Worldwide ==
Opium has been grown in Turkey, Iran, Pakistan, Afghanistan, India, Nepal, Myanmar (formally Burma), Thailand, Laos, China, and Vietnam. It is also believed to be grown in the central post-Soviet states, including Kazakhstan and Kyrgyzstan, Mexico (allegedly imported by immigrant Chinese opium users), and Colombia (reportedly as part of a collaboration between South-East Asian and Colombian drug traffickers). According to a United Nations Office on Drugs and Crime report published in the mid-2000s, large amounts of opium are only cultivated in Myanmar, Afghanistan, and Colombia. Small to intermediate amounts were produced by Laos, Mexico, and Pakistan, while Thailand and Vietnam produced negligible amounts. Of these countries, opium replacement has been implemented in Thailand, Laos, Myanmar, Vietnam, Pakistan, Mexico, and Afghanistan.

In Colombia, much of the opium cultivation takes place under the protection of armed groups opposing the government, limiting the success of opium replacement attempts. Laos has experienced steep declines in cultivation, but former opium farmers are often left destitute due to the scarcity of legal, alternative crops. A similar situation had been observed in Pakistan, which is now experiencing an increase in cultivation due to over spill from Afghanistan. The opium replacement project in Afghanistan is slow, due to the large scale of cultivation, size of the country, poor security, destruction of infrastructure, and weakness of government institutions.

=== Myanmar ===
Myanmar has had some attempts at opium replacement: the United Nations has one project in the Wa State (in the north-east) and the Doi Tung project of Thailand also initiated some activities. The areas covered by such projects were too small to have a significant effect on national production. While opium production has been falling, it is attributed to Myanmar warlords new focus on methamphetamines rather than replacement projects.

=== Thailand ===
Thailand is widely considered the most successful example of opium replacement policies. Although peak production in Thailand was relatively low (150–200 tonnes annually), Thailand's approach to opium replacement is considered the broadest attempt to replace opium cultivation with cultivation of legal crops. More than 150 crops have been introduced to farmers, especially to farmers from temperate climates (suitable to growing opium). The crops include: cabbage, lettuce, kidney beans, tea, coffee, peaches, apples, herbs, and decorative flowers. In general, these crops were cash crops of medium to high value. While many are not native to Thailand, they have been integrated into Thai cooking and culture. Two particularly successful opium replacement projects are still in operation: the Royal Project (established in 1969) and the Doi Tung Project (established in 1988). Both have eliminated opium cultivation from their project areas and have helped farmers improve living conditions. They are used as models and are studied by practitioners of opium replacement from other countries.

== Scepticism ==
Despite the success of Thailand and, to a lesser extent, Pakistan and Vietnam, many people claim that opium replacement is ineffective, noting that Thailand is the only "real" success, but that its success is due to unique and non-replicable factors. Development activities may cause opium cultivators to simply relocate (in what is known as the balloon effect). Despite the presence of opium replacement projects, the world's supply of illicit drugs is continually rising, while prices are falling.

== Organisations ==
Opium replacement projects are typically implemented by national government agencies with the support of an international donor. A contractor implements the project in partnership with the national agency. At the moment, the largest providers of funding are the United States Agency for International Development and the European Union. Major contractors include the German Technical Cooperation Agency and several for-profit firms from the United States. The United Nations Office on Drugs and Crime helps coordinate different efforts, and also funds a few projects.

Opium replacement projects are no longer planned and executed over long time frames, as was the case with Thailand's Royal Project and the Doi Tung project. Rather, they take place over two or three years.

== Effectiveness ==
There are three reasons why Opium Replacement was so successful in Doi Tung of Thailand.

One is that Alternative Development (AD) was preceded by violent intimidation of people living in North Thailand.

The second is that it was such a very small project that a well financed (from foreign countries) NGO could handle it. It has no universal application. In 1988 when the AD project started in Doi Tung the total area under illicit poppy cultivation in Thailand was only 2811 hectares (pg. 23 of UNODC's World Drug Report 1999). The same year 1740 hectares had been eradicated.

The third reason is that the AD project required eradication to succeed. Eradication still continues. 264 hectares of illicit poppy fields were eradicated in 2013 according to the World Drug Report of 2014.

Had Alternative Development or Opium Replacement been so successful in Thailand, why is eradication continuing or for that matter opium use, which according to Table I of UNODC's South East Asian Opium Survey is consumed by 96,284 people? The Alternative Development lobby has in its anxiety to push this concept has ignored all these hard facts, as also that all resolutions on Alternative Development recommend Alternative Development as a means to assist eradication. Thus AD is not all that peaceful either.

== See also ==
- Illegal drug trade
- Opium licensing
- Opium in Iran
- Opium production in Afghanistan
- First and Second Opium Wars
