= Khamr =

Arabic word for an intoxicating substance

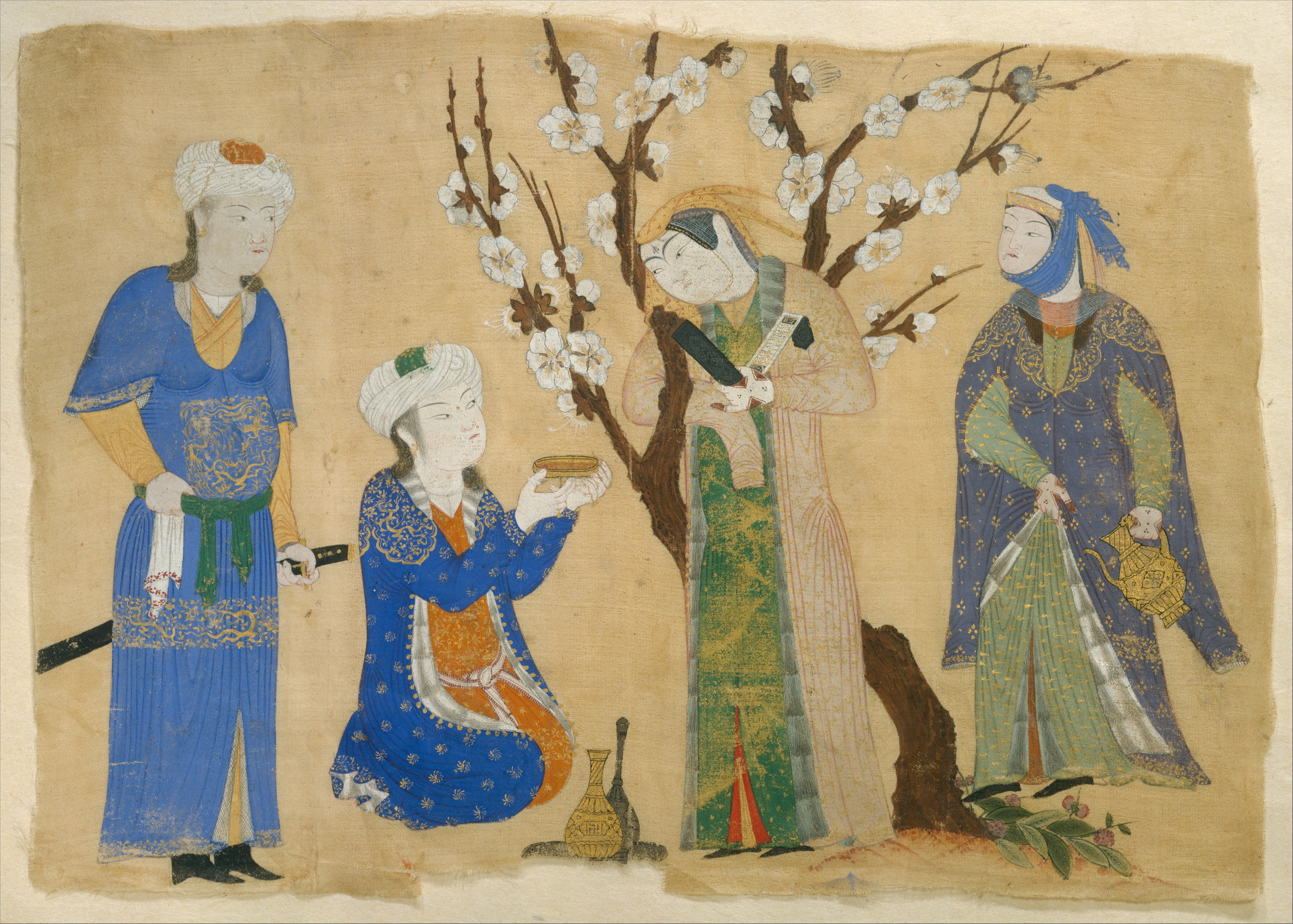
Timurid painting of courtly men enjoying khamr

Khamr (Arabic: خمر, plural, khumūr Arabic: خمور), is an Arabic word for wine or other alcoholic beverages or intoxicants. In an Islamic context, khamr is variously defined as alcoholic beverages, wine or liquor. The position of alcohol in Islam is a complex subject in terms of its historical implementation and nuanced scholarly interpretation. While the dominant belief among Muslims is that the consumption, sale, transport, or service of alcohol in any form is forbidden, there are some disagreements. For example, the Hanafi school interprets khamr to only refer to certain specific beverages, rather than all intoxicants. According to Murtaza Haider of Dawn, "A consensus (ijma) on how to deal with alcohol has eluded Muslim jurists for more than a millennium".

The Islamic definition of khamr varies by the school of jurisprudence (madhhab). While most Islamic jurists have traditionally viewed it as general term for any fermented intoxicating beverage, one school (Hanafi) has limited it to alcohol derived from dates and grapes. Over time, other intoxicants, such as opium and khat, have been classed by jurists as khamr. A minority of Muslims consume alcohol and believe consuming alcohol is not Qur'anically forbidden. In Alawism, an esoteric sect of Islam, Sufi Bektashism, and Alevism, the consumption of alcohol is permissible.

Historically, many Muslim elites consumed alcohol, encompassing the reign of the Umayyads, the Abbasids, Islamic Spain (al-Andalus), and dynasties that ruled Egypt and the eastern, Persianate part of the Muslim world. These included notable rulers such as al-Hakam I (r. 796–822), al-Mu'tamid (r. 870–892), and Abd al-Rahman III (r. 912–961). Drinking wine was also reflected by Islamic poets, such as Abu Nuwas, Ibrahim al-Nazzam, Omar Khayyam, Rumi, and Hafez Shirazi. Wine consumption in the Islamic Golden Age was a mainstream literal practice, sometimes even intertwined with religious rituals. A notable figure during this period was the Islamic philosopher Ibn Sina, who would refresh himself in his studies with a cup of wine.

One of the earliest external records of the Islamic prohibition on alcohol comes from the Chinese traveler Du Huan, who visited the Abbasid Caliphate between 751 and 762. Preserved in the late 8th-century Tongdian encyclopedia, Du Huan's contemporary account predates the formal codification of the madhhabs, he wrote:

斷飲酒，禁音樂。

They [Muslims] prohibit wine and music.

— Tongdian,Volume 193

Modern Islamic countries have low rates of alcohol consumption, and it is completely banned in several of them while strictly controlled in others (such as consumption being allowed only in private places or by non-Muslims). In countries such as Pakistan and Iran, the punishment for consumption of alcohol is disagreed upon; some believe that any punishment for consuming alcohol is un-Islamic, while others believe the proper punishment is flogging, though legal scholars disagree over whether the number of lashes should be 40 or 80. Muslim-majority countries produce a variety of regional distilled beverages such as arak and rakı. There is a long tradition of viniculture in the Middle East, particularly in Egypt (where it is legal) and in Iran (where it is banned). Beer has been historically produced in Mesopotamia (mostly present-day Iraq) and Egypt.

== Definition ==
In fiqh (Islamic jurisprudence), it refers to certain forbidden substances, and its technical definition depends on the madhhab (school of jurisprudence). Most jurists, including those from the Maliki, Shafiʽi, Hanbali and Ahl-i Hadith legal schools, have traditionally viewed it as general term for any intoxicating beverage made from grapes, dates, and similar substances. Hanafi jurists restricted the term to a narrower range of beverages. Over time, some jurists classified other intoxicants, such as opium and khat, as khamr, based on a hadith attributed to Muhammad stating,

- "The Holy Prophet said: 'every intoxicant is khamr, and every intoxicant is forbidden.'"

Other traditions state: (Narrated Abu Kathir As-Suhaimi that he heard Abu Hurairah saying that Muhammad the Messenger of Allah said)

- "Khamr comes from these two trees (plants): The date palm and the grape (vine)."

A minority of faqīh (experts in Islamic jurisprudence), particularly of the Hanafi school, take the concept of khamr literally and forbid only grape-based (or date-based) alcoholic beverages, allowing those made with other fruits, grains, or honey. Other sources (Shaykh Nabil Khan) speaking for the Hanafi Madhhab, state that while not all alcohol is khamr (alcohol not derived from dates and grapes is ‘non-khamr’), all alcohol consumption is forbidden if consumed 1) in sufficient quantity to intoxicate or if 2) consumed for recreational purposes, (i.e. medicinal use may be permitted).

== Scriptural basis ==
=== Quran ===
Quranic verses that at least discourage alcohol include:

They ask you about wine (khamr) and gambling. Say, "In them is great sin and [yet, some] benefit for people. But their sin is greater than their benefit."

— Qur'an 2:219,

"O you who acknowledge, Do not go near prayer, (Salat) while you are stupified (under influence), until you know what you are saying"

— Qur'an 4:43,

O you who have believed, indeed, intoxicants (khamr), gambling, [sacrificing on] stone altars [to other than God], and divining arrows are but defilement from the work of Satan, so avoid it that you may be successful.

— Qur'an 5:90,

The following verse explain that Maisir is prohibited and the reason why (with translation) : Surah Al-Ma'idah 91

=== Hadith ===
Various sahih versions of the following hadith are found in Abu Dawood (3674), Ibn Maajah (3380), Al-Tirmidhi (1295) and other collections:

Allah has cursed wine, its drinker, its server, its seller, its buyer, its presser, the one for whom it is pressed, the one who conveys it, and the one to whom it is conveyed.

According to a hadith where Imam Ahmad recorded what Abu Maysarah said, the verses came after requests by Umar to Allah, to "Give us a clear ruling regarding Al-Khamr!" Many Muslims believe the verses were revealed over time in this order to gradually nudge Muslim converts away from drunkenness and towards total sobriety, as to ban alcohol abruptly would have been too harsh and impractical, since Islam brought "a society steeped in immorality" to one observing "the highest standards of morality."

== Interpretation ==
=== All alcohol or only wine debate ===
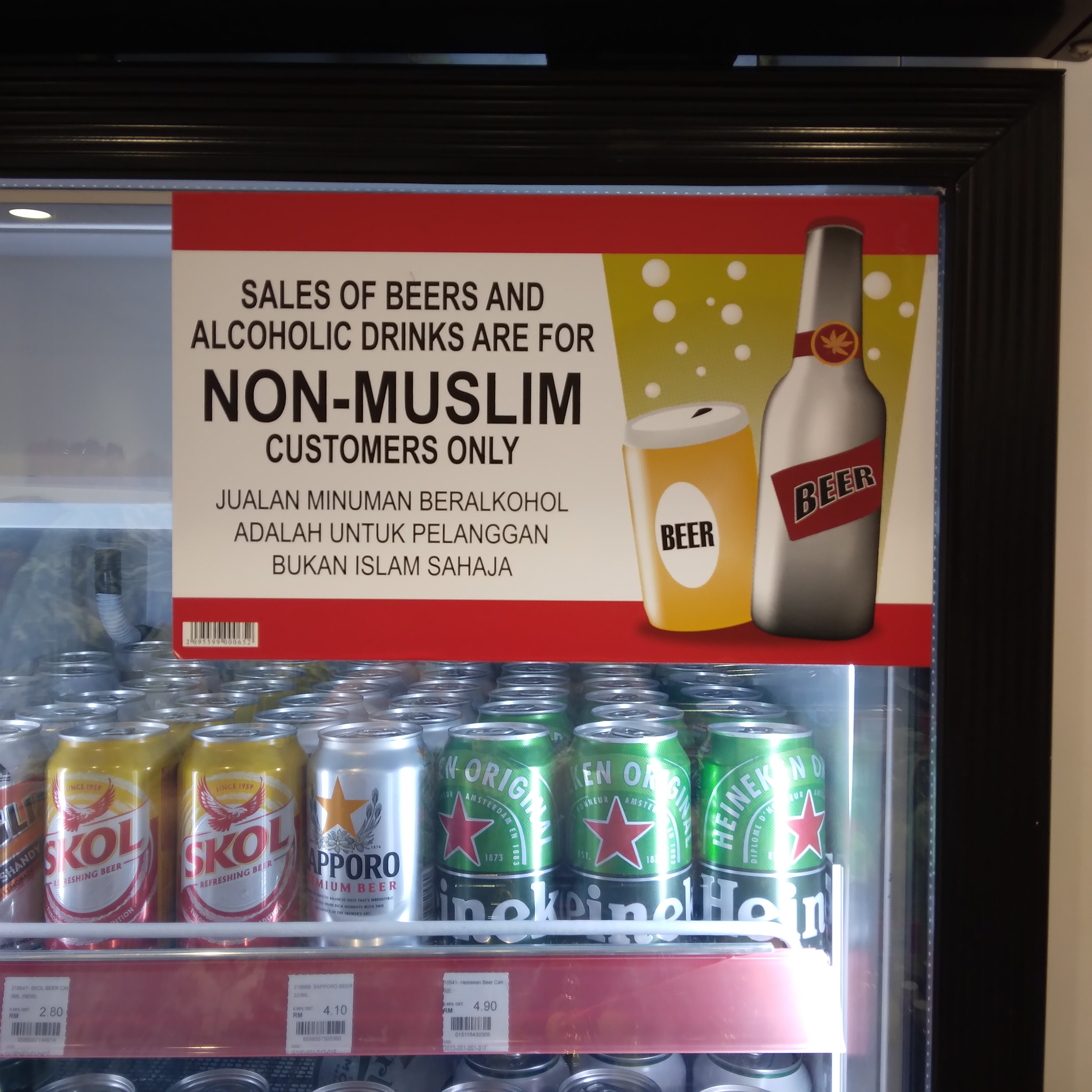
Sign on a refrigerator in a convenience store in Malaysia notifying that sales of beer are for non-Muslim customers only

Early caliphs distributed cooked wine (tilā’) to Muslim troops, as the cooking process caused the wine to be nonalcoholic. However, fermentation could resume in the amphorae, and Caliph Umar II had to prohibit drinking this beverage.

Like the rationalist school of Islamic theology, the Muʿtazila, early Hanafi scholars upheld the unlawfulness of intoxication, but restricted its definition to fermented juice of grapes or grapes and dates. As a result, alcohol derived by means of honey, barley, wheat and millet such as beer, whisky or vodka was permitted according to some minor faction of followers of Abu Hanifa and Abu Yusuf, although all forms of grape alcohol were banned absolutely. (Hanafis traced their view on intoxicants back to Umar (d.644) and Abdullah ibn Masud (c.653).) This was in stark contrast to other schools of fiqh, which prohibit consumption of alcohol in all its forms.

Averroes, the Muslim Andalusi polymath and jurist, explained in his encyclopedia of comparative Islamic jurisprudence the idea of alcohol derived from honey, wheat, barley or corn being haram when used as an intoxicant, in an amount that intoxicates, but permissible if used in a manner intended for medical purpose, hygiene, perfume, etc.:

In their argument by way of reasoning they said that the Koran has explicitly laid down that the Illa (underlying cause) of prohibition of khamr is that it prevents the remembrance of God and breeds enmity and hatred…[this is] found only in a certain quantity of the intoxicating liquor not in what is less than that; it follows therefore that only this quantity be prohibited.

The distinction between the legal status of wine and non-grape alcoholic beverages was reflected in early Hanafi jurists delineated drinking-related offences into two categories:

1. Drinking grape-derived wine (punishment applicable on drinking "even a drop").
2. Intoxication from non-grape intoxicants (certainly prohibited from a religious-moral perspective, but may or may not qualify for criminal punishment).

Since the second category of punishment was specific to the Hanafis (other schools punish drinking regardless of intoxication), they had to come with a legal definition of drunkenness. These definitions ranged from Ibn Qutaybah's, "[a drunk is he] whose intellect has left him so he does not understand a little or much (anything at all)" to Ibn Nujaym's, "[a drunk is he who] does not know (the difference) between a man and a woman or the earth from the sky". Hanafi understanding of Shariah not only permitted adherents to indulge in alcoholic beverages but they could do so up to a near point of total "annihilation".

However, from the 12th century, the Hanafi school embraced the general prohibition of all alcoholic beverages, in line with the other schools.

==== Alcohol consumption as traditionally allowed ====
Contemporary Islamic scholar Shahab Ahmed (1966–2015) argued that fiqh prohibition and punishment of consumption of alcoholic beverages notwithstanding,

an equally distinctive mark of the history of Muslims has been a widely held and constantly reiterated alternative evaluation of wine in non-legal discourses where wine and the consumption thereof are invested with a positive meaning expressive of higher, indeed rarified value – and this positive meaning has been enacted in society both in literary reiteration and in the physical consumption of wine in social settings.

Rudi Matthee also writes that many Muslim elites during the reign of the Umayyads, the Abbasids, Islamic Spain (al-Andalus), and dynasties that ruled Egypt and the eastern, Persianate half of the Muslim world consumed alcohol.

Rather than being relegated to "‘bad’ or ‘non-observant’ Muslims, or talked about only as a metaphor for the mystic's ‘spiritual intoxication’ in the midst of the divine, wine consumption in the Islamic Golden Age was a mainstream literal practice, sometimes even intertwined with religious rituals. "The Ottoman traveller Evliya Çelebi, for example, describes a party at a palace of Sultan Murad IV where wine was consumed, followed by mid-afternoon prayer and Quranic recitation." 10th century polymath Abu Zayd al-Balkhi, in a "foundational work" of medicine, The Welfare of Bodies and Souls, waxed rhapsodic on the virtues of wine, "unique among all foods and drinks, for none of these have in them anything of which the pleasure is transported from the body to the soul, producing therein". Physician and philosopher Ibn Sina (c.980-1037), sometimes known as Avicenna in the west, 'routinely drank wine in good company’ when ‘not engaged in the problem of defining God'. According to Gina Hames some scholars argue that the Quran only prohibited wine drinking when used in pagan rituals or when misused to create social divisions or further Godlessness.

=== Punishment ===
The Quran does not prescribe a penalty for consuming alcohol. Among hadith, the only reference for punishment comes from one by Anas ibn Malik (according to Murtaza Haider of the newspaper/website Dawn in Pakistan), who is reported to have stated that Muhammad prescribed 40 lashes "administered with two palm branches ... for someone accused of consuming alcohol". Saudi Arabian scholar Muhammad Al-Munajjid also states that a hadith report narrated by Sahih Muslim (3281) from Anas reports that Muhammad flogged someone who had drunk wine with palm branches stripped of their leaves and with shoes.

According to Muhammad Al-Munajjid, the consensus of classical fuqaha’ for the punishment for consumption of alcohol is flogging, but scholars do not agree on the number of lashes to be administered; "the majority of scholars are of the view that it is eighty lashes for a free man" and forty for slaves and women. Similarly Murtaza Haider writes, "a consensus (ijmāʿ) on how to deal with alcohol has eluded Muslim jurists for more than a millennium". The "Maliki, Hanbali, and Hanafi schools" of Islamic jurisprudence consider 80 lashes to be lawful punishment, the Shafi’i school calls for 40 lashes. "The Hadith does not cover the matter in sufficient detail. ... Is it 40 or 80 lashes? Can one substitute palm branches with a cane or leather whips? What constitutes as proof for consumption?"

==== Contemporary punishments in Muslim majority countries ====
- A man convicted of consuming alcohol was given 80 lashes in a public square in the Iranian city of Kashmar on 10 July 2018.
- In Pakistan the penal code, under "the Prohibition (Enforcement of Hadd) Order of 1979, awards 80 lashes to those convicted of consuming alcohol". Non-Muslims may consume alcohol in licensed areas in Pakistan, but violating alcohol regulations there may result in "severe penalties, including fines, imprisonment, and public flogging in some regions".
- In Saudi Arabia lashes "can also be part of the sentence" for consuming alcohol, according to the British Embassy.

== Contemporary state laws ==
Laws on alcohol consumption as of 2025 in some Muslim majority countries include:

- in the UAE, Muslims and non-Muslims are forbidden to drink except at home or in licensed venues like bars, clubs, and restaurants.
- in Dubai, non-Muslims may consume alcohol, within licensed hotels, restaurants, and bars.
- in Saudi Arabia, public consumption, sale, and importation of alcohol are generally prohibited. However, diplomats in compounds like Riyadh's Diplomatic Quarter (DQ) can import limited alcohol for personal use, and must obtain permits from their embassies. No-alcoholic beer and mocktails are permissible.

== See also ==
- Religion and alcohol
- Nabidh
- Golden Crescent
- Hookah
- Islamic views on tobacco
- Hudood Ordinances#Prohibition (alcohol) Order
- Maisir (Gambling)
- Opium in Iran
- Opium production in Afghanistan
