= Kamminga =

Surname list

Kamminga is a surname. Notable people with the surname include:

- Arno Kamminga (born 1995), Dutch swimmer
- Johan Kamminga, (born 1948), Australian archaeologist
- Jorrit Kamminga (born 1976), Director at International Council on Security and Development
- Menno T. Kamminga (born 1949), Dutch international law scholar
