= List of massacres in Iran =

This is a list of massacres in Iran.

Name	Date	Location	Deaths	Perpetrators	Notes
Destruction of Persepolis	February 330 BC	Persepolis	Unknown	Ancient Macedonian army	Civilian population and captives slaughtered at random upon conquest of the city. City burned to the ground in May 330 BC.
Massacre of the Cossaei	December 324 BC / Early 323 BC	Zagros Mountains	Likely 100s–1000	Ancient Macedonian army	Alexander the Great put the entire Iranian Cossaei people to the sword in forty days. Unknown death toll but most likely a few hundred to a thousand.
Istakhr massacre	651	Istakhr	40,000	Rashidun Caliphate	Part of the Arab conquest of Persia
Mongol mass-killings	1219–1258	Khwarazmian Empire	10,000,000–15,000,000	Mongol Empire	75%–90% of Iranian population killed
Siege of Isfahan (1387)	1387	Isfahan	70,000–200,000	Timurid Empire	
Massacre at the Russian Embassy in Tehran	30 January 1829	Tehran, Qajar Iran	54	Persian Mujahideen, Employees of the British mission in Iran	Mass murder of members of the Russian embassy and the Armenian refugees they sheltered. Subsequently, the Mujahideen killed almost the entire Russian embassy
1870 Shushtar Massacre	1870	Shushtar	Unknown, possibly hundreds or thousands	Governor of Khuzestan	Much of the local Mandaean community of Shushtar was killed at the Borj-e-Ayar dam against the will of Naser al-Din Shah Qajar. The site of this killing is often locally referred to as "band-i subbī kosh" (Dam of the Mandaean Massacre) for this reason. By 1877, only two Mandaean families remained in Shushtar.
1903 Isfahan anti-Baháʼí riots	1903	Isfahan	Unknown	Crowds	
1910 Shiraz blood libel	30 October 1910	Shiraz	12	Angry mobs	Anti-Jewish pogrom
Ottoman genocide of Assyrians during the Persian Campaign	1914–1918	North-west Iran	12,000	Ottoman Empire	According to The New York Times
Haftevan massacre	1915	Haftevan, Iran	750–800 Assyrians and Armenians	Ottoman Empire, Kurds	Ottoman forces and Kurdish collaborators attacked the Assyrian village of Haftevan in northwestern Iran, and killed between 750 and 800 Assyrians and Armenians.
Goharshad Mosque rebellion	August 1935	Goharshad Mosque	151-5,000	Shahrbani police units Imperial Iranian Army	
15 Khordad protests	5 June 1963	Tehran and Qom	86 dead and 205 wounded	Imperial Army of Iran, Shahrbani, SAVAK	Part of the prelude to the Iranian Revolution.
Islamic Revolution	7 January 1978 – 11 February 1979	Iran	Several thousands 2,000-3,000 (Charles Kurzman Estimation); 532-2,781 (Spencer Tucker estimation); 60,000+ (Islamic Republic Government estimation)	Imperial Army of Iran	
1978 Qom protest	9 January 1978	Qom	5-300	Imperial Army of Iran	Part of the 1979 Iranian revolution
Cinema Rex fire	19 August 1978	Abadan	377–470	Islamic militants	Part of the 1979 Iranian revolution
Black Friday	8 September 1978	Tehran	118	Imperial Army of Iran	Part of the 1979 Iranian revolution
Haft-e Tir bombing	28 June 1981	Tehran	74	MEK	74 people were killed in a bombing targeting a meeting of leaders of the Islamic Republican Party at the party's headquarters
1981 Iranian Prime Minister's office bombing	30 August 1981	Tehran	8	Masoud Keshmiri (agent of MEK)	
1981–1982 Iran massacres	1981–1982	Iran	3,500+	Government of the Islamic Republic of Iran	3,500+ executed
Chemical bombing of Sardasht	28 June 1987	Sardasht, West Azerbaijan	130	Iraq	Iraq dropped mustard gas bombs on Sardasht, West Azerbaijan, In two separate bombing runs on four residential areas, the attack killed 130 people and injured 8,000
Bombing of Kermanshah's park shelter	16 March 1988	Kermanshah, Kermanshah province	76	Iraq	76 persons—mostly women/children—who were in the shelter, were killed and more than 200 persons were injured
Iran Air Flight 655	3 July 1988	Strait of Hormuz, near Qeshm Island	290	U.S. Navy	A civilian passenger Airliner was shot down by the United States Navy, killing all on board which included 66 children. In 1996, the US agreed to pay 62 million dollars in compensation to the victims families and those affected.
1988 executions of Iranian political prisoners	July–December 1988	Iran	2,800–30,000+	Government forces	
Chain murders of Iran	1988–1998	Iran and abroad	80+	Government of the Islamic Republic of Iran	Both in Iran as well as external operations abroad, including the assassinations of Fereydoun Farrokhzad and Shapour Bakhtiar
Imam Reza shrine bombing	20 June 1994	Mashhad	25–26	Ramzi Yousef, Abdul Shakoor, MEK, Al-Haraka al-Islamiya al-Iraniya	70–200 injured
2009 Pishin bombing	18 October 2009	Pishin, Sistan and Baluchestan Province	43	Jundallah	43 people died in the attack, in the province of Sistan and Baluchistan, and dozens more injured
2010 Khorasan shootout	2 January 2010	South Khorasan Province	10	Drug smugglers	
2017 Tehran attacks	7 June 2017	Tehran	18	ISIS	
2019 Khash–Zahedan suicide bombing	13 February 2019	Kurin	27	Jaish ul-Adl	
Mahshahr massacre	16–20 November 2019	Mahshahr	40–148	Islamic Revolutionary Guard Corps	Killing of protesters during 2019–2020 Iranian protests
Saravan massacre	22 February 2021	Saravan	10	Islamic Revolutionary Guard Corps	IRGC forces blocked a road used by local fuel truckers. As residents tried to confront the military over the roadblock, the army opened fire. The shootings, which killed at least 10 people (one of them a 17-year-old child), sparked outrage and triggered the 2021–2022 Sistan and Baluchestan protests.
Mostazafan Foundation shooting	14 May 2022	Ilam province	4	Unidentified former employee	A former employee of the Mostazafan Foundation killed 3 workers and injured 5 more with a firearm. He later committed suicide.
2022 Shah Cheragh attack	26 October 2022	Shiraz, Fars province	16	ISIS	Mass shooting at Shah Cheragh mosque. Authorities stated that the attackers were not Iranian nationals.
Attack on Izeh market	16 November 2022	Izeh, Khuzestan province	7	Iranian security forces	Part of Mahsa Amini protests. Violent crackdown on locals and protesters, 7 killed and 15+ injured
2024 Kerman bombings	3 January 2024	Kerman	103	Islamic State – Khorasan Province	A double suicide bombing occurred on the fourth anniversary of Qasem Soleimani's assassination during a commemorative ceremony, by Islamic State – Khorasan Province, a regional branch of the Salafi jihadist group Islamic State (IS)
Kerman Shooting	21 January 2024	Kerman	5	Unidentified soldier	A soldier opened fire inside a barracks dormitory, killing five of his comrades.
2024 Saravan killings	27 January 2024	Saravan	9	Unidentified gunmen	Killings of nine Pakistani workers by unknown assailants
Faryab shooting	17 February 2024	Mazraeh Imam, Faryab, Kerman	13	Bahram Jeshanpur	Twelve people are killed after 30-year-old Bahram Jeshanpur opened fire on his relatives during a family dispute at a village of Mazraeh Imam in Faryab, Kerman province. The gunman was later shot and killed by police in a nearby village
Israeli strikes on Evin prison	23 June 2025	Evin, Tehran	71–79	Israel Defense Forces	Part of the Twelve-Day War. Israel struck Evin prison, killing 79 including inmates, families of prisoners, conscript prison guards, doctors, social workers, a lawyer, a 5-year-old child, and residents of the area.
2026 Iran massacres	December 2025–March 2026	Iran	*7,007 (confirmed by HRANA) 3,117–36,500+	Islamic Revolutionary Guard Corps, Basij, Police Command, government forces, and State-sponsored militias	Part of the 2025–2026 Iranian protests and 2026 Iran War. The Iranian government perpetrated mass killings during an internet blackout to suppress pro-democracy protestors, resulting in 7,007 confirmed deaths per HRANA, with a total death toll potentially reaching over 36,500 people.
2026 Minab school attack	28 February 2026	Minab	168–180	United States	The attack was part of a series of American airstrikes during the 2026 Iran war. The victims were primarily schoolchildren. Investigations by The New York Times, CBC and NPR among others concluded that the United States was likely responsible for the strike.
2026 Lamerd sports hall attack	28 February 2026	Lamerd	21	U.S. Army	A sport hall in Lamerd was bombed, killing 21 civilians and injuring at least 100

== See also ==
- List of massacres of Nizaris
