= Ayub Afridi (drug lord) =

Pakistani politician and drug lord

Deputy for the Federally Administered Tribal Areas
- In office 6 August 1990 – 1993
- President: Ghulam Ishaq Khan
- Prime Minister: Nawaz Sharif

Personal details
- Born: c. 1930–1939 Khyber Agency, North-West Frontier Province, British India
- Died: 24 November 2009 (aged 70–79) Landi Kotal, Federally Administered Tribal Areas, Pakistan
- Party: Islamic Democratic Alliance (1990–1993); Pakistan Peoples Party (1993–2009)
- Occupation: Drug smuggler, politician

Ayub Afridi (Pashto: ایوب اپریدی, Urdu: ایوب افریدی; c. 1930–1939 – 24 November 2009) was a Pakistani drug smuggler and tribal politician. He is considered to be the primary founder of the widespread drug trade (particularly heroin) in Afghanistan. There are a variety of speculations that Afridi, following his close collaboration with the CIA for Operation Cyclone against the Soviet Union, was approached by the United States as a part of an effort to gain easier access to Afghanistan and the semi-autonomous tribal areas of Pakistan after 9/11.

== Early life ==
Born in Khyber Agency during the British Raj, Ayub grew up in a Pashtun family, Landi Kotal, the principal city located around the Khyber Pass, and was an ethnic Pashtun belonging to the Afridi tribe of Zakha Khel.

The westernmost regions of British India that the Pashtuns lived in had historically maintained a strong cultural and ethnic connection to Afghanistan rather than India proper, and therefore Afridi's province was not greatly affected by the Partition of India in 1947, in stark contrast to Pakistan's Sindh and Punjab provinces. He started off as a regular truck driver in his youth but quickly used his transportation connections to make a small fortune by smuggling gold and other contraband. Afridi was known to have forged close ties with General Muhammad Zia-ul-Haq after the latter deposed Pakistan's civilian government in 1977 and declared martial law, establishing a military dictatorship. Afridi's connections with Afghan tribes in Pakistan's northwest and throughout Afghanistan itself made him a key player in Zia-ul-Haq and the United States's indirect war against the Soviets in Afghanistan.

Afridi has children and grandchildren who are living in Pakistan and leading their lives. This includes Fakhir Alam, Mehtab Alam, Salman Shah and others.

Afridi died on 24 November 2009 after suffering a heart attack, and was in his 70s at the time of his death, though his exact age is not known. He is buried at the Ayub Afridi Kalay cemetery in his hometown of Landi Kotal.

== Involvement in the Soviet-Afghan War (1979–1989) ==
Ayub Afridi was a key player in the Soviet–Afghan War. In close collaboration with the CIA, he was able to supplement huge amounts of money for the Mujahideen in Afghanistan through his growing of poppies to supply the heroin trade. Using his smuggling network to move weapons supplied by the CIA to the mujahidin rebels fighting inside Afghanistan. Afridi used the same channels to move Afghan opium to secret laboratories in Pakistan's Federally Administered Tribal Areas. Afridi was elected as a Member of National Assembly, Pakistan, in 1990. He contested the election as a free candidate from Khyber Agency.

== 1995 arrest ==
In December 1995, the Americans were able to trick Afridi into leaving his sanctuary in Afghanistan and coming to Pakistan by promising him right of passage. As soon as he touched down in Pakistan, he was arrested in connection with importing hashish into Belgium. He served three years of his sentence before being shipped to Pakistan on 25 August 1999 after serving a three-and-a-half-year sentence in a US prison and paying a 50,000-dollar fine. An agreement was reached where he would face another trial in Pakistan. In Pakistan he was given a seven-year sentence for the same charge, exporting hashish into Belgium. He only served a few weeks of his sentence.

Most of his properties in various affluent areas across Pakistan were confiscated by the Government of Pakistan. As is the custom in with the Maliks of the area, in the mid-eighties he built a well-fortified residence, known as Ayub Afridi Kala (Ayub Afridi Fort), in Landi Kotal in Khyber Agency.

The biggest drug bust of the world happened on the Kohat road of Peshawar when his heroin and hashish was busted by anti-narcotics Pakistan.

After the September 11 attacks he was freed from prison in Karachi after serving just a few weeks of a seven-year sentence for the export of 6.5 tons of hashish, seized at Antwerp, Belgium, in the 1980s. He had also been fined 4 million rupees (US$82,000). No reasons were given for Afridi's release, or under which legislation he was allowed to return to his home town in Khyber Agency in Federally Administered Tribal Areas.

== 2005 legal trouble ==
In 2005 Afridi was accused of international drug trafficking and ordered to appear before the Pakistani Supreme Court on 17 November 2005 in an appeal challenging an order of the special appellate court against the forfeiture of his assets. Afridi was sentenced by the Pakistani Anti-Narcotics Force (ANF) Court in a drug smuggling case and was declared absconder when he failed to appear before the court. On 30 March 2006 the Supreme Court allowed the Anti Narcotics Force to confiscate a 100-room 'palace', petrol pumps, and other properties worth Rs 167.8 million.
