= Jorritsma =

Jorritsma is a West Frisian patronymic surname ("Jorrit's son") that may refer to

- Aletta Jorritsma (born 1989), Dutch rower
- Annemarie Jorritsma (born 1950), Dutch politician
- Gerben Jorritsma (born 1993), Dutch speed skater
- Hans Jorritsma (born 1949), Dutch field hockey player
- John Jorritsma (born 1956), Dutch politician
- Jorrit Jorritsma (1945–2012), Dutch speed skater, coach and sports presenter
