= 1903 in Iran =

- Decades
- See also: Other events of 1903; Years in Iran

The following lists events that happened during 1903 in Qajar era.

== Incumbents ==
- Monarch: Mozaffar ad-Din Shah Qajar

== Events ==
- 1903 Isfahan anti-Baháʼí riots.

== Births ==
- January 23 – Ivan Galamian, American musician.
- February 17 – Sadegh Hedayat, Iranian writer.
- February 22 – Hamdam al-Saltaneh Pahlavi, first child and daughter of Reza Shah.
- February 23 – Mahmoud Hessabi, Iranian scientist.
- March 1 – Ali Shayegan, Iranian politician.
- July 26 – Mahmoud Shehabi Khorassani, Iranian lawyer.
- ? – Abbas Aram, Persian diplomat and politician.
- ? – Abolhassan E'tesami, Iranian artist.
- ? – Habib Sabet, Iranian businessman and entrepreneur.
- ? – Hassan Emami, Iranian judge.
- ? – Hossein Sadaghiani, Iranian footballer.
- ? – Khalil Maleki, Iranian politician.
- ? – Lotfollah Taraghi, member of parliament, publisher and journalist,.
- ? – Mohammad Parvin Gonabadi, Iranian translator.
- ? – Mohammad-Taqi Shoushtari, Iranian Islamic scholar.
- ? – Mojtaba Minovi, Iranian academic.
- ? – Nader Batmanghelidj, Iranian politician.
- ? – Noureddin Esheni Qudejani, Iranian religious servant.
- ? – Reza Roosta, Iranian politician.

== Deaths ==
- ? – Mirza Mahmud Khan Hakim ol-Molk, Iranian politician and physician.
