= Opium production in Afghanistan =

Opium industry in Afghanistan

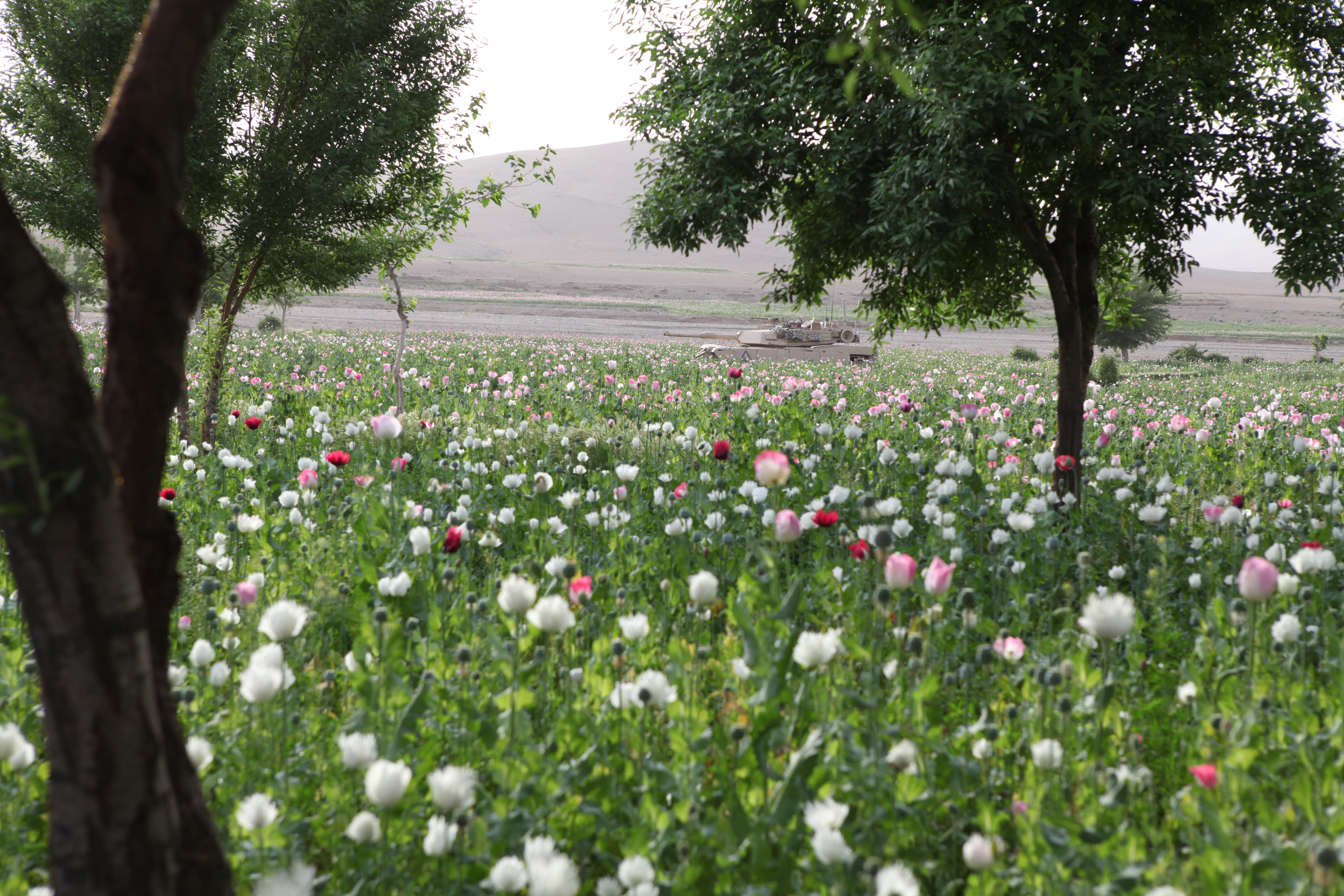
Poppy plantation in Gostan valley, Nimruz Province

Afghanistan has long had a history of opium poppy cultivation and harvest. Prior to the 2021 Taliban takeover of Afghanistan, Afghanistan's harvest produced more than 90% of illicit heroin globally, and more than 95% of the European supply. More land was used for opium in Afghanistan than for coca cultivation in Latin America. The country was the world's leading illicit drug producer from 2001 until 2024. In 2007, 93% of the non-pharmaceutical-grade opiates on the world market originated in Afghanistan. In 2019 Afghanistan still produced about 84% of the world market. This amounts to an export value of about US$4 billion, with a quarter being earned by opium farmers and the rest going to district officials, insurgents, warlords, and drug traffickers. In the seven years (1994–2000) prior to a Taliban opium ban, the Afghan farmers' share of gross income from opium was divided among 200,000 families.

The Taliban have taken a mixed stance on opium over the years. Poorly enforced restrictions in the 1990s were a prelude to a full ban on religious grounds in 2000. However, the Afghan war in 2001 led to the ban being only briefly effective. The opium trade spiked in 2006 after the Taliban lost control of local warlords. Despite having previously banned opium, the Taliban used opium money to fuel their two-decade campaign to retake Afghanistan, with Taliban allegedly earning up to 60% of their annual revenue from the trade. The then Afghan government also outlawed production, but despite help from coalition military forces to tamp down on drug trafficking, the ban did little to stop production. After the Fall of Kabul in 2021, the opium trade boomed, and most farmers planted at least some opium for harvest in spring 2022. The Taliban outlawed production again in April 2022, during the poppy harvest. In November 2023, a U.N report showed that in the entirety of Afghanistan, poppy cultivation dropped by over 95%, removing it from its place as being the world's largest opium producer. In 2023, U.N declared that the Chin State and Sagaing Region of Myanmar produce harvested poppy surpassing Afghanistan. The rise of poppy cultivation has extended up to Manipur, an Indian state. There are reports that financing Kuki-Chin militants comes from poppy export.

== History ==
A world map showing heroin production regions

The dry climate and difficulty of transporting fresh produce makes export agriculture hard in Afghanistan. The opium poppy however is drought tolerant, doesn't spoil on long voyages, is easy to transport and store, and sells for a premium. With a farm gate price of approximately $125 per kilogram for dry opium (2007 prices), an Afghan farmer can make 17 times more profit growing opium poppy ($4,622 per hectare), than by growing wheat ($266 per hectare).

Afghanistan first began producing opium in significant quantities in the mid-1950s, to supply its neighbor Iran after poppy cultivation was banned there. Afghanistan and Pakistan increased production and became major suppliers of opiates to Western Europe and North America in the mid-1970s, when political instability combined with a prolonged drought disrupted supplies from the Golden Triangle.

=== Soviet period (1979–1989) ===
After a Soviet-backed left-wing government in Afghanistan failed to gain popular support, the Soviets decided to invade. The U.S., Saudi Arabia, Pakistan and other countries began to covertly support the mujahideen guerrillas fighting the Soviets. During the conflict, the Afghan-Pakistan border became a key area in the global heroin trade, with a network of drug labs opening in 1979 and 1980. A number of resistance leaders concentrated on increasing opium production in their regions to finance their operations, regardless of its haram Islamic status, in particular Gulbuddin Hekmatyar, Mullah Nasim Akhundzada, and Ismat Muslim. The production was doubled to 575 metric tons between 1982 and 1983. During the 1970s, opium production in Afghanistan stood at 100 tonnes annually. It grew to 2,000 tonnes by 1991. Afghanistan supplied 60% of the US market and 80% of the European in 1984. According to historian Alfred McCoy "caravans carrying CIA arms into that region for the resistance often returned to Pakistan loaded down with opium." The Washington Post reported in May 1990 that the US government had over several years been receiving reports of heroin trafficking by some of its allies, including "firsthand accounts of heroin smuggling by commanders under Gulbuddin Hekmatyar", but chose not to investigate. The CIA sent around $600 million in aid to Hekmatyar's group Hizb-i-Islami militia during the war against the Soviets. Nasim Akhundzada, who controlled the traditional poppy growing region of northern Helmand, desired regional growth of his poppy and narcotics dealing. His inventory of traditional poppy was purchased during the harvest at low prices. This, and the cultivation of poppy growth were enforced with the threat of torture and execution. To maximise control of trafficking, Nasim maintained an office in Zahidan, Iran.

It was alleged by the Soviets that US Central Intelligence Agency (CIA) agents were helping smuggle opium out of Afghanistan, either into the West, in order to raise money for the Afghan resistance, or into the Soviet Union, in order to weaken it through drug addiction. According to Alfred McCoy, the CIA supported various Afghan drug lords, including Gulbuddin Hekmatyar and Haji Ayub Afridi.

Another factor was the eradication effort inside Pakistan (whose Inter-Services Intelligence were coincidentally supporters of the Mujahideen). The Pakistani government, US Agency for International Development (USAID) and other groups were involved in attempting to eliminate poppy cultivation from certain areas of the North-West Frontier Province (now Khyber Pakhtunkhwa) bordering Afghanistan. The opium industry shifted from Pakistan into Afghanistan during the 1980s.

=== Warlord period (1992–1996) ===
When the Soviet Army was forced to withdraw in 1989, civil war between the Republic of Afghanistan and the Mujahedeen continued until the government's collapse in 1992. The fall of the government created a power vacuum: various Mujahideen factions started fighting against each other for power. With the discontinuation of Western support, they resorted ever more to poppy cultivation to finance their military existence.

=== Rise of the Taliban (1996–2001) ===
During the Taliban rule, Afghanistan saw a bumper opium crop of 4,500 metric tons (4,400 long tons; 5,000 short tons) in 1999.

In July 2000, Taliban leader Mullah Mohammed Omar, collaborating with the UN to eradicate heroin production in Afghanistan, declared that growing poppies was un-Islamic, resulting in one of the world's most successful anti-drug campaigns. The Taliban enforced a ban on poppy farming via threats, forced eradication, and public punishment of transgressors. The result was a 99% reduction in the area of opium poppy farming in Taliban-controlled areas, roughly three quarters of the world's supply of heroin at the time. The ban was effective only briefly due to the deposition of the Taliban in 2001.

However, some people (Martin, An Intimate War, 2014), suggest that certain parties benefited from the price increase during the ban. Some, even believe it was a form of market manipulation on the part of certain drug lords. Dried opium, unlike most agricultural products, can easily be stored for long periods without refrigeration or other expensive equipment. With huge stashes of opium stored in secret hideaways, the Taliban and other groups that were involved in the drug trade were in theory able to make huge personal profits during the price spikes after the 2000 ban and the chaos following the September 11 attacks.

=== Afghan War (2001–2021) ===
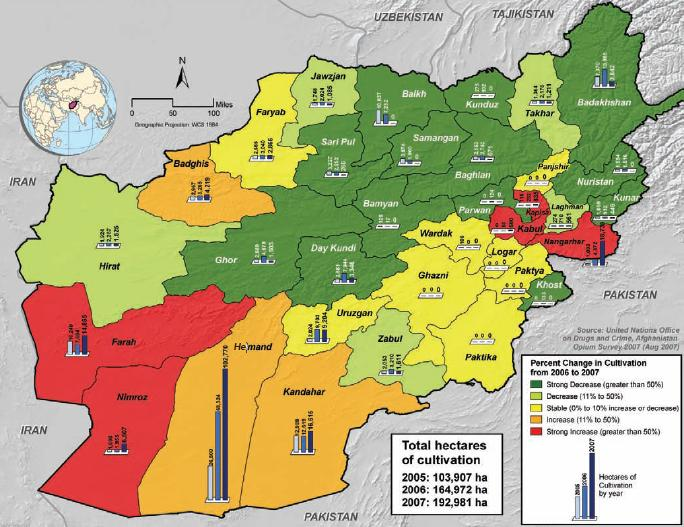
Opium production levels for 2005–2007

During and after the 2001 invasion, the US allied with powerful Pashtun warlords who had been involved in drug smuggling in the country’s south-east. According to historian Alfred McCoy, this meant that when the Taliban was overthrown, "the groundwork had already been laid for the resumption of opium cultivation and the drug trade on a major scale." Ahmed Wali Karzai, the younger brother of Hamid Karzai, was allegedly a prominent drug trafficker and on the CIA payroll, though he denied this. In 2008, The New York Times reported that despite credible reports of his involvement in the trade, these were not investigated by the US government.

In December 2001, a number of prominent Afghans met in Bonn, Germany, under UN auspices to develop a plan to reestablish the State of Afghanistan, including provisions for a new constitution and national elections. As part of that agreement, the United Kingdom (UK) was designated the lead country in addressing counter-narcotics issues in Afghanistan. Afghanistan subsequently implemented its new constitution and held national elections. On December 7, 2004, Hamid Karzai was formally sworn in as president of a democratic Afghanistan."

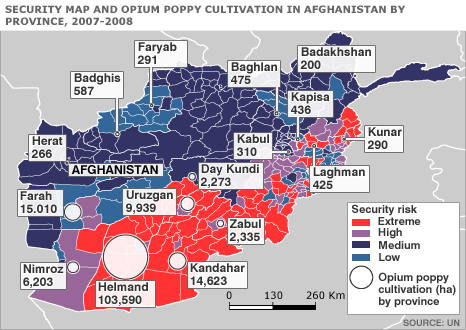
Regional security risks and levels of opium poppy cultivation in 2007–2008.

Two of the following three growing seasons saw record levels of opium poppy cultivation. Corrupt officials may have undermined the government's enforcement efforts. Afghan farmers claimed that "government officials take bribes for turning a blind eye to the drug trade while punishing poor opium growers."

By 2005, Afghanistan was producing 90% of the world's opium. Estimates made in 2006 by the UN Office on Drugs and Crime (UNODC) estimate that 52% of the nation's GDP, amounting to US$2.7 billion annually, was generated by the drug trade. The rise in production has been linked to the deteriorating security situation, as production is markedly lower in areas with stable security. By some, the extermination of the poppy crops is not seen as a viable option because the sale of poppies constitutes the livelihood of Afghanistan's rural farmers. Some 3.3 million Afghans are involved in producing opium. Opium is more profitable than wheat and destroying opium fields could possibly lead to discontent or unrest among the indigent population. Some poppy eradication programs have, however, proven effective, especially in the north of Afghanistan. The opium poppy eradication program of Balkh Governor Ustad Atta Mohammad Noor between 2005 and 2007 successfully reduced poppy cultivation in Balkh Province from 7,200 hectares (18,000 acres) in 2005 to zero by 2007.

The Afghanistan Opium Risk Assessment 2013, issued by UNODC, suggests that the Taliban has, since 2008, been supporting farmers growing poppy, as a source of income for the insurgency.

Former US State Department Principal Deputy Assistant Secretary for the Bureau of International Narcotics and Law Enforcement Affairs Thomas Schweich, in a New York Times article dated July 27, 2007, asserted that opium production was protected by the government of Hamid Karzai as well as by the Taliban, as all parties to political conflict in Afghanistan, as well as criminals, benefit from opium production, and, in Schweich's opinion, the US military turned a blind eye to opium production as not being central to its anti-terrorism mission. In fact, per UN estimates the Taliban's share of the Afghan opium trade was far smaller than that belonging to those allied with the government of President Karzai. In March 2010, NATO rejected Russian proposals for Afghan poppy spraying, citing concerns over income of Afghan people. There have also been allegations of US and European involvement in Afghanistan's drug trafficking with links to Taliban.

On October 28, 2010, agents of Russia's Federal Service for the Control of Narcotics joined Afghan and US anti-drug forces in an operation to destroy a major drug production site near Jalalabad. In the operation, 932 kg (2,055 lb) of high quality heroin and 156 kg (344 lb) of opium, with a street value of US$250 million, and a large amount of technical equipment was destroyed. This was the first anti-drug operation to include Russian agents. According to Viktor Ivanov, Director of Russia's Federal Service for the Control of Narcotics, this marked an advance in relations between Moscow and Washington. Hamid Karzai called the operation a violation of Afghan sovereignty and international law.

As had been the case in Indochina during the Vietnam War, the US invasion in fact caused a massive increase in opium production, the aforementioned eradication efforts being largely window dressing. A 2014 SIGAR report claimed “levels of cultivation have risen by more than 200,000 hectares… since 2001” and that “opium-poppy cultivation levels are at another all-time high, despite $7.8 billion obligated for counternarcotics efforts,” concluding that:

counternarcotics appears to have fallen off the agenda of both the U.S. government and the international community, despite the fact that it is impossible to develop a coherent and effective strategy for a post-2014 Afghanistan without taking full account of the opium economy. As long as insurgent commanders are able to fund themselves through the opium trade, and as long as corrupt officials profit from the illicit economy, there may be few incentives for making peace in some areas of the country.

A December 2014 UNAIDS study showed an increase of 7% in one year alone.

The facts of an apparently non-significant resultant change to opium production is corroborated in a report by BBC, dated to 20 July 2015:

Nine years of intense fighting by international troops did nothing to stop the production. In fact it only became worse. The only difference was that it has been pushed out beyond the central populated zone to less governed badlands beyond the Helmand canal.

=== Foreign involvement ===
Approximately 40,000 foreign troops attempted to manage "security" in Afghanistan, principally of 32,000 regular soldiers from 37 NATO forces: the International Security Assistance Force. 8,000 US and other special operations forces, mainly privately contracted soldiers of fortune, made up the balance. There was significant resistance, both from the ideological and theocratic Taliban, especially in southern Afghanistan, as well as from independent local warlords and drug organizations. Antonio Maria Costa, executive director of UNODC, described the situation: "There is no rule of law in most of the southern parts of Afghanistan—the bullets rule."

In a 2026 interview with Chris Hedges, CIA whistleblower John Kiriakou claimed he was told by a DEA official that Afghans were allowed to cultivate poppy by the United States for export to Russia and Iran, in order to "weaken their societies". According to the US official, "almost all" of Afghanistan's heroin production went to Russia and Iran.

=== New Taliban government (since 2021) ===
After the Fall of Kabul in 2021, the opium trade boomed, but the Taliban outlawed production again on 3 April 2022. The ban came in the middle of the springtime poppy harvest in what would have been a bumper year for the crop. After the end of the war, most farmers had dedicated at least some portion of their crop to poppy. The ban also came in the middle of a major economic crisis; opium has long been used to supplement local incomes since it sells for a premium over traditional crops.

According to a report published by the United Nations Office on Drugs and Crime (UNODC) in November 2022, the expanse of opium cultivation in Afghanistan has extended to 233,000 hectares. Opium farmers experienced a threefold increase in income, from US$425 million in 2021 to US$1.4 billion in 2022, constituting approximately 29% of the 2021 agricultural sector's value. Subsequent to the enforcement of the cultivation ban in April 2022, the price of opium underwent a sharp escalation.

In a 2023 report, poppy cultivation in southern Afghanistan was reduced by over 80% as a result of Taliban campaigns to stop its use toward Opium. This included a 99% reduction of Opium growth in the Helmand Province. In November 2023, a U.N report showed that in the entirety of Afghanistan, poppy cultivation dropped by over 95%, removing it from its place as being the world's largest opium producer.

However, according to Iranian officials, there is still no documented evidence in the reduction of drug production inside Afghanistan. The activities of drug smugglers indicate that drug production is continuing as it did during the previous era. According to the Iranian officials eradicating poppy cultivation in Afghanistan is beyond the capability of the Taliban. Former drug kingpins, such as Bashir Noorzai, also enjoy support from the Taliban and hold influential roles.

In 2025, four provinces with opium poppy cultivation in 2024 of Balkh, Farah, Laghman and Uruzgan, were declared opium poppy-free.

== Worldwide impact ==
According to European Union (EU) agencies, Afghanistan has been Europe's main heroin supplier for more than 10 years (through 2008). Heroin enters Europe primarily by two major land routes: the long-standing 'Balkan route' through Turkey; and, since the mid-1990s, the 'northern route', which leaves northern Afghanistan through Central Asia and on to Russia (and is sometimes colloquially referred to as the 'smack track'). There is an estimated 1.5 million (1.3–1.7 million) opioid users in the EU, with an average prevalence of 4 to 5 per 1,000. In 2005, there were around 7,000 acute drug deaths, with opioids being present in the blood of 70% of the deceased. There was a minimum of 49,000 seizures resulting in the interception of an estimated 19.4 metric tons (19.1 long tons; 21.4 short tons) of heroin. Countries reporting the largest number of seizures (in descending order): UK (2005), Spain, Germany, Greece, and France. Countries reporting the largest quantities of heroin seized in 2005 (in descending order): Turkey, UK, Italy, France, the Netherlands.

Presently with the resurgence of high output production of opium and heroin in post-Taliban Afghanistan, there is an ongoing heroin addiction epidemic in Russia which is claiming 30,000 lives each year, mostly among young people. There were two and half million heroin addicts in Russia by 2009.

== Medical production ==
The International Council on Security and Development (ICOS) has proposed legalizing opium production for medical purposes. Opium can be manufactured into codeine and morphine, which are both legal pain-killers. The Governor of Afghanistan's Helmand Province, Hayatullah Hayat is a proponent of eventually legalizing opium production to create morphine.

Others have argued that legalizing opium production would neither solve the problem nor would it be workable in practice. They argue that illegal diversion of the crop could only be minimized if the Afghans had the necessary resources, institutional capacity and control mechanisms in place to ensure that they were the sole purchaser of opiate raw materials. For them, there is currently no infrastructure in place to set up and administer such a scheme. They reason that in the absence of an effective control system, traffickers would be free to continue to exploit the market and there would be a high risk that licit cultivation would be used for illegal purposes and that the Afghan government would be in direct competition with the traffickers, thereby driving up the price of opium, and attracting more farmers to cultivate. The Afghan government has ruled out licit cultivation as a means of tackling the illegal drug trade: however in Turkey in the 1970s, legalizing opium production, with US support brought illicit trafficking under control within four years. Afghan villages have strong local control systems based around the village shura, which with the support of the Afghan government and its international allies, could provide the basis for an effective control system. This idea is developed in the recent Senlis Council report "Poppy for Medicine" which proposes a technical model for the implementation of poppy licensing and the legal control of cultivation and production of Afghan morphine.

Some believe that there is also little evidence to show that Afghan opium would be economically competitive in a global market place. Australia, France, India, Spain, and Turkey currently dominate the export market for licit opiates. Due to the high cost of production in countries where cultivation is undertaken on small landholdings, such as India and Turkey, licit production requires market support (the production costs for the equivalent of 1 kg of morphine in 1999 was US$56 in Australia, US$159.77 in India and US$250 in Turkey). The current cost of production of one kilogram of morphine equivalent in Afghanistan is approximately US$450. Therefore, opium could potentially be considered an alternative for those who find morphine prices to be too high.

The price of illicit opium far exceeds that of licit, (in India, in 2000, the price for licit opium was US$13–29 per kilogram, but for illicit US$155–206). Although there are many complex reasons behind the decision to grow poppy, one of them is the current economic dependence of poppy farmers on the illicit trade. Whilst traffickers continue to be free to exploit the illicit market, legalization would not change this. Demand for illicit opiates would not disappear even if Afghan opium were used for licit purposes and a vacuum would open that traffickers could exploit. However, currently 100% of Afghan opium is diverted to the illegal opium trade and funds in some cases terrorist activities. Despite eradication efforts since the international intervention in 2001, poppy cultivation and illicit opium production has increased, as UNODC figures show. A licensing system would bring farmers and villages into a supportive relationship with the Afghan government, instead of alienating the population by destroying their livelihood, and provide the economic diversification that could help cultivators break ties with the illicit opium trade.

The International Narcotics Control Board states that an over production in licit opiates since 2000 has led to stockpiles in producing countries 'that could cover demand for two years'. Thus, some say Afghan opium would contribute to an already oversupplied market and would potentially cause the supply and demand imbalance that the UN control system was designed to prevent. However, the World Health Organization points out that there is an acute global shortage of poppy-based medicines such as morphine and codeine. This is largely due to chronic underprescription (especially in countries where morphine is extremely highly priced). The International Narcotics Control Board which regulates opium supply throughout the world enforces the 1961 Single Convention on Narcotic Drugs: this law provides that countries can only demand the raw poppy materials corresponding to the use of opium-based medicines over the last two years and thus limits countries who have low levels of prescription in terms of the amounts they can demand. As such, 77% of the world's opium supplies are being used by only six countries, leaving the rest of the world lacking in essential medicines such as morphine and codeine. A second-tier supply system, that complements the current UN control system by supplying opium-based medicines to countries currently not receiving the poppy-based pain relief medicines needed, would maintain the balance established by the UN system and provide a market to Afghan-made poppy-based medicines.

== Opium addiction within Afghan society ==
Afghanistan has seen a high rate of opium addiction among refugees returning from Iran and Pakistan. Zalmai Afzali, spokesman for the Ministry of Counter-Narcotics in Afghanistan reports an increase in the total number of drug users by over half a million, to 1.5 million, between 2005 and 2010.

According to the UNODC, there are 2 - 2.5 million people using drugs in Afghanistan. This has significant consequences for health and governance within the country. Drug use in Afghanistan has become rife, not just among the unemployed, but also among government staff, farmers, and those working in private businesses. It is estimated that almost half of these users take drugs most days, with many taking heroin multiple times a day. Drug users in Afghanistan have reported consequent problems emotionally, with family and relationships, with gaining employment, physical health effects, and problems with the law. Relatives of drug users have reported facing physical abuse from the user, with some relatives reporting depression and self-harm as a result of the family drug use and violence. There are also a significant number of Afghan children who use drugs, particularly in provinces such as Kandahar and Helmand where the children have participated in poppy lancing.

== The Afghan economy and opium ==
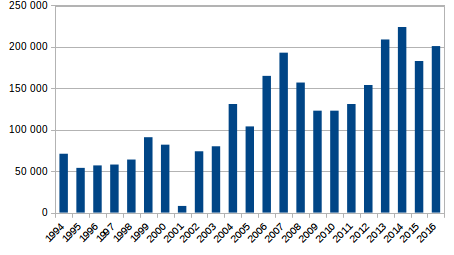
Afghanistan opium poppy cultivation, 1994–2016 (hectares)

The 2004 United Nations Development Programme ranked Afghanistan number 173 of 177 countries, using a human development index, with Afghanistan near or at the bottom of virtually every development indicator including nutrition, infant mortality, life expectancy, and literacy. Several factors encourage opium production, the greatest being economic: the high rate of return on investment from opium poppy cultivation has driven an agricultural shift in Afghanistan from growing traditional crops to growing opium poppy.

Opium cultivation on this scale is not traditional, and in the area controlled by the Helmand Valley Authority in the 1950s the crop was largely suppressed.

"Despite the fact that only 12 percent of its land is arable, agriculture is a way of life for 70 percent of Afghans and is the country's primary source of income. During good years, Afghanistan produced enough food to feed its people as well as supply a surplus for export. Its traditional agricultural products include wheat, corn, barley, rice, cotton, fruit, nuts, and grapes. However, its agricultural economy has suffered considerably […] Afghanistan's largest and fastest cash crop is opium."

Poppy Cultivation and the Opium Trade have been said to have had a more significant impact on the civilians in Afghanistan than the impact of wheat farming and livestock trading. As farmers in Afghanistan were once heavily reliant on wheat farming to make sufficient income, the development of poppy cultivation has given many of these farmers a boost in capital, even though opium may be a more dangerous product to distribute. In addition, as the demand for Opium has elevated, women have more opportunity to work in the same setting as their male counterpart.

Afghanistan's rugged terrain encourages local autonomy, which, in some cases, means local leadership committed to an opium economy. The terrain makes surveillance and enforcement difficult.

Afghanistan's economy has thus evolved to the point where it is now highly dependent on opium. Although less than 4 percent of arable land in Afghanistan was used for opium poppy cultivation in 2006, revenue from the harvest brought in over $3 billion—more than 35 percent of the country's total gross national product (GNP). According to Antonio Costa, "Opium poppy cultivation, processing, and transport have become Afghanistan's top employers, its main source of capital, and the principal base of its economy." Today, a record 2.9 million Afghanis from 28 of 34 provinces are involved in opium cultivation in some way, which represents nearly 10 percent of the population. Although Afghanistan's overall economy is being boosted by opium profits, less than 20 percent of the $3 billion in opium profits actually goes to impoverished farmers, while more than 80 percent goes into the pockets of Afghan's opium traffickers and kingpins and their political connections. Even heftier profits are generated outside of Afghanistan by international drug traffickers and dealers.

Traditionally, processing of Afghan's opium into heroin has taken place outside of Afghanistan; however, in an effort to reap more profits internally, Afghan drug kingpins have stepped up heroin processing within their borders. Heroin processing labs have proliferated in Afghanistan since the late 1990s, particularly in the unstable southern region, further complicating stabilization efforts. With the reemergence of the Taliban and the virtual absence of the rule of law in the countryside, opium production and heroin processing have dramatically increased, especially in the southern province of Helmand.

According to the United Nations Office on Drugs and Crime (UNODC) 2007 Afghanistan Opium Survey, Afghanistan produced approximately 8,200 metric tonnes of opium – nearly double the estimate of global annual consumption. In an April 25, 2007 op-ed in the Washington Post, Antonio Maria Costa, executive director of UNODC, asked "Does opium defy the laws of economics? Historically, no. In 2001, prices surged tenfold from 2000, to a record high, after the Taliban all but eliminated opium poppy cultivation across the Afghan territory under its control. So why, with last year's bumper crop, is the opposite not occurring? Early estimates suggest that opium cultivation is likely to increase again this year. That should be an added incentive to sell.

He speculated, "So where is it? I fear there may be a more sinister explanation for why the bottom has not fallen out of the opium market: major traffickers are withholding significant amounts.

"Drug traffickers have a symbiotic relationship with insurgents and terrorist groups such as the Taliban and al-Qaeda. Instability makes opium cultivation possible; opium buys protection and pays for weapons and foot soldiers, and these in turn create an environment in which drug lords, insurgents and terrorists can operate with impunity.

"Opium is the glue that holds this murky relationship together. If profits fall, these sinister forces have the most to lose. I suspect that the big traffickers are hoarding surplus opium as a hedge against future price shocks and as a source of funding for future terrorist attacks, in Afghanistan or elsewhere."

=== Effect on job opportunities ===
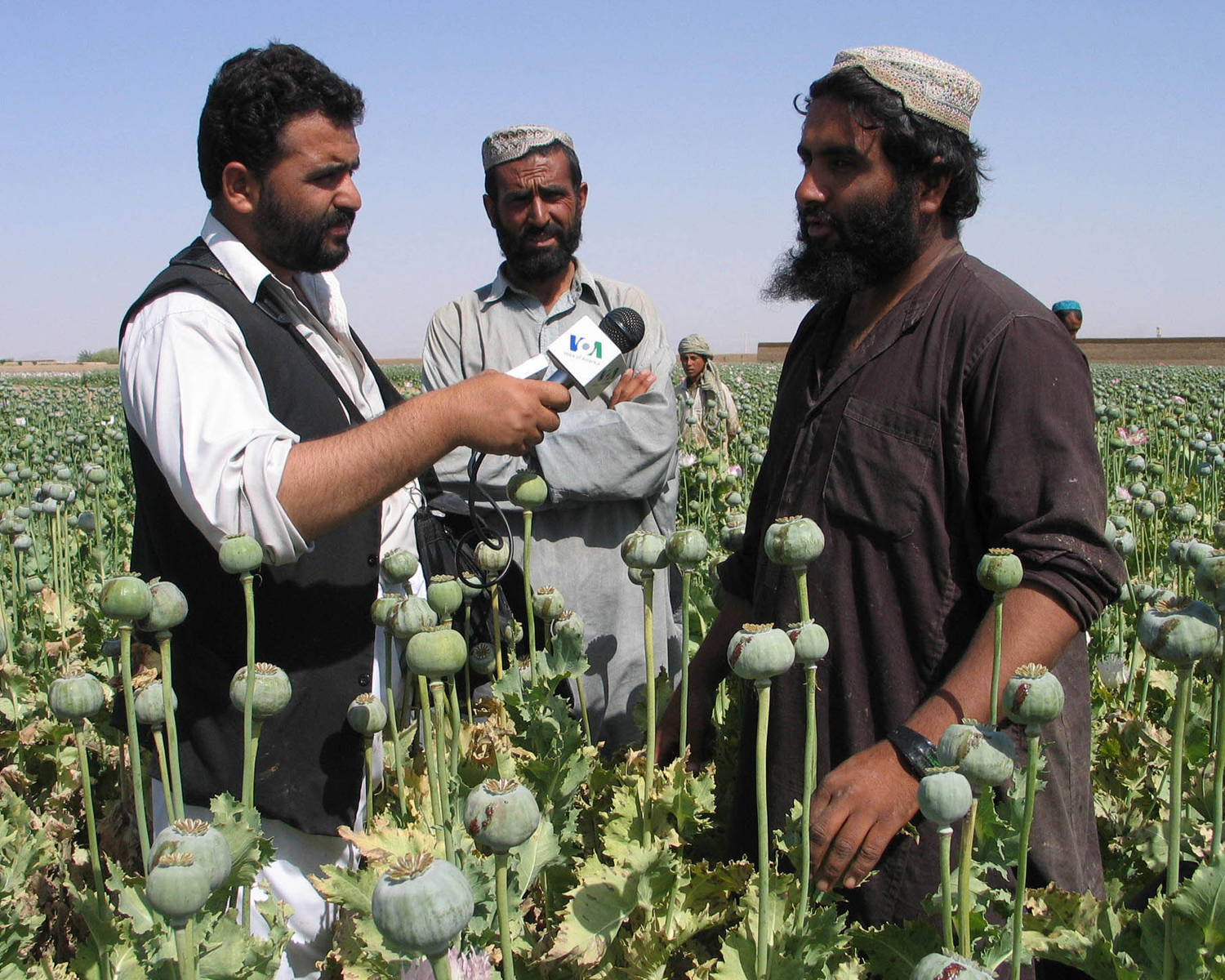
Voice of America reporter interviewing poppy cultivators.

Due to globalization and the development of trade, traditional ways of sustaining life for villagers has been forced to change. Before, people relied on wheat farming and livestock, whereas today, poppy cultivation is the most prominent economic activity. This can be attributed to higher profits from poppy cultivation and lack of opportunity for other farming practices due to land scarcity and more accessible loans from money providers for this activity.

War, economic instability, and poverty caused changes in the way villagers maintained their villages. Competition for scarce land and resources resulted in unsustainable practices, causing soil erosion and therefore making the land less productive. The cultivation of poppy, however, generated greater profits than wheat farming for the farming villagers due to the higher yielding possibilities with less land (poppies require less irrigation than wheat), and greater demand for the profitable drug trade of the highly valued opium, prepared from poppies. Many emigrants to places such as Pakistan and Iran witnessed the profitability of poppy cultivation in land development, through association with local landowners and businessmen, and were inspired to bring about the same economic improvement in their own lives and villages. Also, opium trade proved to be more cost-efficient than livestock trade, since large amounts of opium are easier to transport than livestock. Local shopkeepers used capital, which was acquired from buying opium resins from farmers and selling them to dealers at the Tajikistan-Afghanistan border, to invest in their own small shops, generating more income. Poor villagers saw this as a good investment opportunity, as it meant more efficient farming of one product with the possibility of creating economic stability in their villages.

=== Impacts of opium production within Afghan villages ===
Aside from the obvious threat of addiction, opium production is changing the dynamic of many Afghan villages. Wealth distribution, for example, has changed significantly as the opium economy has created a "new rich" in which young men have control. This newfound wealth for the young men of Afghanistan is troubling to many of the village leaders as before they were revered for their wisdom, and now are given little if any respect. It has also been noted that relationships among fathers and sons, neighbours, and family in general, are drastically changing as leadership roles in the economy continue to shift. As the young men have increased contact with the outer world, they have become aware of different methods of performing traditional tasks, which have created tensions between the young men and the white beards. Also, there has been a shift from the level of co-operation, trust, and reciprocity within villages to a move of self-interest, all of which have been adversely affected by the war.

=== Impact on water table ===
Between 2013 and 2020 many producers in the Helmand Valley installed solar powered water pumps. The irrigation, from artesian wells, has allowed the amount of land under irrigation to increase several fold. However the water table had lowered 3 metres by mid 2020, and there is concern that large numbers of people will be displaced if this continues.

== Production and Afghan governance ==
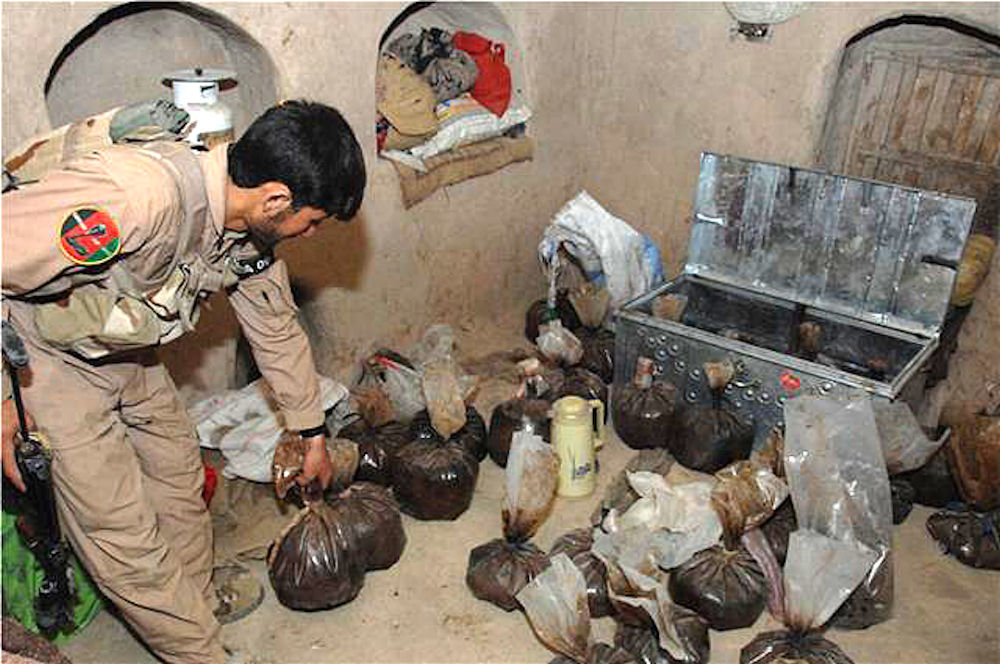
An Afghan National Police officer is picking up a bag of opium in 2009 inside a house that was raided in Helmand Province.

While the Taliban were considered a threat both to the human rights of Afghans, and to other areas of the world by providing a sanctuary for transnational terrorists, they also demonstrated an ability to strictly enforce a moratorium on opium production. Since their overthrow in 2001, stopping their enforcement with methods including beheading, opium poppy cultivation has been steadily increasing over the past two decades. There is evidence that the Taliban ban carried the seeds of its own lack of sustainability, due to a many-fold increase in the burden of opium-related debt (locking many households into dependence on future opium poppy cultivation), forcing asset sales to make ends meet, etc. It also appears that the opium ban weakened the Taliban politically. Thus the sustainability of the ban beyond the first year was highly doubtful, even if the Taliban had not been overthrown in late 2001.

"Even though the Karzai government made opium poppy cultivation and trafficking illegal in 2002, many farmers, driven by poverty, continue to cultivate opium poppy to provide for their families. Indeed, poverty is the primary reason given by Afghan farmers for choosing to cultivate opium poppy." With Afghanistan's limited irrigation, in which qanats (karez) still play a big role, transportation and other agricultural infrastructure, growing alternative crops is not only less profitable, but more difficult.

In 2006, opium production in the province increased over 162 percent and now accounts for 42 percent of Afghan's total opium output. According to the UNODC, the opium situation in the southern provinces is "out of control."

=== Nexus between the drug industry and hawala ===
There is an important nexus between drugs and hawala (informal money transfer system) in Afghanistan. The UN analysis is based on interviews with a sample of 54 hawala dealers in the main centers of hawala activity of Afghanistan as well as during a visit to Peshawar, Pakistan. In addition, interviews were conducted with users of the hawala system (drug dealers, businessmen, traders, international aid workers), regulators (government officials, central bank personnel), and formal service providers (bankers, accountants). In addition to hawala, they found protection payments and connections, by which the drug industry has major linkages with local administration as well as high levels of the national government.

See informal money transfer systems to support clandestine activity, including terrorism, drug trade, and intelligence collection.

Different localities studied by the UNODC give different views of the laundering of drug funds. It is difficult to get a solid sense of the overall economy. In Faizabad, for example, it has been indicated that during certain times of the year close to 100% of the liquidity of the hawala system in the province is derived from drugs, whereas in Herat, the Northern Alliance stronghold, it was estimated that only 30% of the hawala market's overall transaction volume is directly linked to drugs. Analysis of data gathered in places like Herat was complicated by confirmed links between drug money and legitimate imports. The southern region (Helmand and Kandahar provinces) is also a key centre for money laundering in Afghanistan (about 60% of the funds are drug related and 80–90% of the hawala dealers in Kandahar [the former Taliban stronghold] and Helmand are involved in money transfers related to narcotics).

Helmand has emerged as a key facilitator of the opium trade, both between provinces and exports, while overall estimates of the local hawala markets' drug-related component are of a similar order of magnitude to those in Kandahar. This finding adds weight to the notion that the major trading centers in these two neighboring provinces should be treated as essentially one market. Bearing this in mind, the study calculated that Helmand could account for roughly US$800 million of Afghanistan's drug-related hawala business and that Herat is the second largest contributor, with in the range of US$300–500 million of drug money laundered annually.

Furthermore, Dubai appears to be a central clearing house for international hawala activities. In addition, various cities in Pakistan, notably Peshawar, Quetta, and Karachi, are major transaction centers. It appears that even in the case of drug shipments to Iran, payments for them come into Afghanistan from Pakistan ... the hawala system has been key to the deepening and widening of the "informal economy" in Afghanistan, where there is anonymity and the opportunity to launder money.

Hawala, however, also contributes positively to the regional economy. It has been central to the survival of Afghanistan's financial system through war. According to Maimbo (2003), "integral to processes of early development and vital for the continued delivery of funds to the provinces." "The hawala system also plays an important role in currency exchange. It participates in the Central Bank's regular foreign currency auctions, and was instrumental in the successful introduction of a new currency for Afghanistan in 2002–2003."

== Opium smuggling into Iran ==
While Herat is not the highest-volume area of opium trade, Herat, and the other Iranian border areas of Farah, and Nimroz, have some of the highest prices, presumably due to demand from the Iranian market. "Opium prices are especially high in Iran, where law enforcement is strict and where a large share of the opiate consumption market is still for opium rather than heroin. Not surprisingly, it appears that very significant profits can be made by crossing the Iranian border or by entering Central Asian countries like Tajikistan." According to UNODC estimates bulk of Afghanistan's opium production goes to Iran either for consumption or for on-ward export to other countries in the region and Europe. Iran currently has the largest prevalence of opiate consumption in its population globally. Iran also accounts for 84% of total opiate seizures by law enforcement agencies in the world, interdicting tens of thousands of tons of opiates annually. The Iranian government has gone through several phases in dealing with its drug problem.

First, during the 1980s, its approach was supply-sided: "Law-and-order policies with zero tolerance led to the arrest of tens of thousands of addicts and the execution of thousands of narcotics traffickers." "There are an estimated 68,000 Iranians imprisoned for drug trafficking and another 32,000 for drug addiction (out of a total prison population of 170,000, based on 2001 statistics)"

Kevin Wayne McLaughlin, writing in the Journal of Foreign Affairs said "Tehran also has spent millions of dollars and deployed thousands of troops to secure its porous 1,000-mile [1,600 km] border with Afghanistan and Pakistan… a few hundred Iranian drug police die each year in battles with smugglers. Referring to the head of the UNODC office in Iran, Roberto Arbitrio, McLaughlin quoted Arbitrio in an interview with The Times. "You have drug groups like guerrilla forces, [who] … shoot with rocket launchers, heavy machine guns, and Kalashnikovs."

A second-phase strategy came under then-President Mohammad Khatami, focused more on prevention and treatment. Drug traffic is considered a security problem, and much of it is associated with Baluchi tribesmen, who recognize traditional tribal rather than national borders. Current (2007) reports cite Iranian concern with ethnic guerillas on the borders, possibly supported by the CIA.

Iranian drug strategy changed again under President Mahmoud Ahmadinejad, who took office in 2005. Iran's drug policy has been reconsidered and shifted back toward supply interdiction and boosting border security. It is unclear if this is connected to more wide-ranging concerns with border security, perhaps in relation to Baluchi guerillas in Iran.

Samii's 2003 paper described Iran's "primary approach to the narcotics threat [as] interdiction. Iran shares a 936-kilometer border with Afghanistan and a 909-kilometer border with Pakistan, and the terrain in the two eastern provinces—Sistan va Baluchistan and Khorasan—is very rough. The Iranian government has set up static defenses along this border. This includes concrete dams, berms, trenches, and minefields".

As per UN drug report of 2011, Iran accounts for highest rate of opium and heroin seizure rates in the world, intercepting 89% of all seized opium in the world. Within a span of thirty years, 3700 Iranian police officers have been killed and tens of thousands more injured in counter narcotics operations mostly on Afghan and Pakistan borders.

== Counter-narcotics policy ==
Given the fact that a third of the combined legal and illegal Afghan economy is based on the illegal opium industry, counter-narcotics policy is currently one of the most important elements of domestic politics. Despite law enforcement measures with a dominant focus on crop eradication programs, Afghan opium production has doubled in just two years. This has shown that currently there is no correlation between poppy crop eradication and the level of poppy cultivation or opium production. The reason for this is the underlying economic nature of the opium problem. Poverty and structural unemployment are the main reason for 3.3 million Afghans' full dependence on poppies.

Poppy crop eradication could even have damaging side-effects for Afghanistan's process of stabilization and reconstruction. Director of policy research for the Senlis Council, Jorrit Kamminga, says:

the poppy eradication campaign has been ineffective, counterproductive and could well give the Taliban the decisive advantage in their struggle for the hearts and minds of the Afghan people.

He is referring to US-inspired aerial fumigation campaigns, planned for spring 2008 but never initiated. So far, crop eradication is done manually or mechanically from the ground. Chemical spraying could further destabilize rural areas and risk losing support for NATO's stabilization mission.

In 2005, the US Drug Enforcement Administration (DEA), along with its Afghan partners, shut down the operations of Hajj Bazz Mohammad, a Taliban-linked narco-terrorist.

=== Alternative crops ===
Since the Taliban allegedly made Afghanistan's opium business easy, offering credit, seeds and fertilizer to farmers to grow the drugs that fuel the Taliban insurgency, the US authorities were determined to change that momentum by offering similar incentives to steer farmers away from the drug trade and toward alternative, legitimate crops, like grapes, wheat and saffron.

Domestic production of ephedrine from ephedra bushes growing wild in the mountains and its subsequent chemical conversion to methamphetamine has also emerged in recent years, and has grown to rival opium production in some areas.

== See also ==
- Afghan morphine
- Crime in Afghanistan
- Economy of Afghanistan
- Golden Crescent
- Haji Bagcho
- Bashir Noorzai
- Illegal drug trade
- Jundallah
- Opium in Iran
- The Senlis Council
- Opium Season, the true story of a young American in Afghanistan running an aid program to counter the opium trade
