= List of countries by prevalence of cocaine use =

A map of countries by cocaine use, 2009

This is a list of states, and some territories by the annual prevalence of cocaine use, as percentage of the population aged 12–64, unless otherwise indicated, published by the United Nations Office on Drugs and Crime (UNODC). The indicator is the "annual prevalence" rate which is the percentage of the youth and adult population who have consumed the drug at least once in the past year.

== Nations ==
Country or Entity	Prevalence (%)	Year	Notes
United States	2.7	2017	(Age 15-64)
England and Wales	2.67	2017	(Age 16–59)
Albania	2.5	2014	(Age 15-64)
Australia	2.5	2016	(Age 14+)
Scotland	2.34	2014	(Age 16–64)
Spain	2.4	2022	(Age 15–64)
Netherlands	2.5	2021	(Age 15–64)
Northern Ireland	1.8	2014	(Age 15–64)
Montenegro	1.8	2017	(Age 15-64)
Uruguay	1.8	2014	(Age 15–65)
Argentina	1.67	2017	(Age 15–64)
Denmark	1.5	2021	(Age 15–64)
France	1.6	2017	(Age 15–64)
Ireland	2.3	2019	(Age 15–64)
Canada	1.47	2015	(Age 15–64)
Poland	0.3	2018	(Age 15–64)
Chile	1.38	2016	(Age 15–64)
Costa Rica	1.33	2015	(Age 15–64)
Bermuda	1.3	2009	(Age 16–65)
Italy	1.21	2017	(Age 15–64)
Norway	1.5	2021	(Age 15–64)
Iceland	1.06	2015	(Age 15–64)
South Africa	1.02	2011	(Age 15–64)
Brazil	1	2016	(Age 15–64)
Jamaica	0.98	2010	(Age 15–64)
Grenada	0.9	2003	(UNODC estimates)
Haiti	0.88	2010	(Age 15–64)
Honduras	0.87	2005	(Age 12–35)
Belize	0.85	2005	(Age 12–65) BBC
Switzerland	0.81	2016	(Age 15–64)
Croatia	1.8	2019	(Age 15–64)
Mexico	0.8	2016	(Age 12–65)
Colombia	0.7	2013	(Age 12–65)
Turks and Caicos Islands	0.7	2002	(UNODC estimates)
Saint Vincent and the Grenadines	0.7	2002	(UNODC estimates)
Peru	0.7	2010	(Age 12–65)
Nicaragua	0.69	2006	(Age 12–65)
Venezuela	0.64	2011	(Age 12–65)
Bosnia and Herzegovina	0.63	2008	(Age 15–64)
Cayman Islands	0.6	2000	(UNODC estimates)
Israel	0.6	2016	(Age 18–65)
Estonia	1	2018	(Age 15–64)
Germany	1.6	2021	(Age 15–64)
New Zealand	0.6	2008	(Age 16–64; cocaine/crack)
Saint Lucia	0.6	2010	(Age 15–64)
Sweden	1.3	2021	(Age 15–64)
Belgium	1.4	2018	(Age 15–64)
Finland	0.9	2018	(Age 15–64)
Latvia	1.3	2020	(Age 15–64)
Malta	0.5	2013	(Age 15–64)
Slovenia	0.8	2018	(Age 15–64)
Trinidad and Tobago	0.48	2010	(Age 15–64)
Austria	1.5	2022	(Age 15–64)
Barbados	0.4	2006	(Age 15–64)
Greece	0.4	2015	(Age 15–64)
Greenland	0.4	2003	(UNODC estimates)
Liechtenstein	0.4	1998	
Luxembourg	0.5	2019	(Age 15–64)
El Salvador	0.37	2014	(Age 12–65)
Bolivia	0.36	2014	(Age 12–65)
North Macedonia	0.34	2015	(Age 15–64)
Dominican Republic	0.32	2010	(Age 12–65)
Ukraine	0.32	2015	(Age 15–64)
Hungary	0.3	2019	(Age 15–64)
Bulgaria	0.6	2020	(Age 15–64)
Czech Republic	0.9	2020	(Age 15–64)
Hong Kong	0.25	2008	(Age 15–64)
Paraguay	0.25	2003	(Age 12–64)
Suriname	0.25	2013	(Age 12–65)
Russia	0.23	2007	(Age 15–64)
Guatemala	0.21	2005	(Age 15–64)
Cape Verde	0.2	2012	(Age 15–64)
Portugal	0.2	2017	(Age 15–64)
Romania	0.5	2019	(Age 15–64)
Slovakia	0.1	2019	(Age 15–64)
Zambia	0.2	2000	(Tentative estimates)
Namibia	0.2	1998	
Cyprus	0.2	2016	(Age 15–64)
Armenia	0.1	2005	(Age 15–64)
India	0.1	2018	(Age 10–75)
Lebanon	0.1	2001	(UNODC estimates)
Lithuania	0.6	2021	(Age 15–64)
Zimbabwe	0.1	2000	
Serbia	0.1	2014	(Age 18–64)
Taiwan	0.1	2005	(Age 15–64)
Kenya	0.1	2016	(Age 15–64)
Panama	0.1	2015	(Age 12–65)
Ecuador	0.08	2013	(Age 12–65)
Philippines	0.07	2016	(Age 10–69)
Belarus	0.06	2007	(Age 15–64)
Morocco	0.05	2004	(Age 15–64)
Thailand	0.05	2007	(Age 15–64)
Turkey	0.05	2017	(Age 15–64)
Maldives	0.04	2012	(Age 15–64)
Kuwait	0.04	2005	(Age 15–64)
Moldova	0.04	2008	(Age 15–64)
South Korea	0.03	2004	(Age 15–64)
Japan	0.03	2017	(Age 15–64)
Egypt	0.02	2006	(Age 15–64)
São Tomé and Príncipe	0.02	1997	
Sierra Leone	0.02	1996	
Algeria	0.01	2010	(Age 12+)
Angola	0.01	1999	
Indonesia	0.0	2015	(Age 10–60)
Chad	0.01	1995	
Nigeria	0.093	2017	(Age 15–64)
Iran	0.01	2008	(Age 15–64)
Afghanistan	0.001	2009	(Age 15–64)
Syria	0.001	2005	(Age 15–64)
Singapore	0.0002	2004	

== European and Canadian cities ==
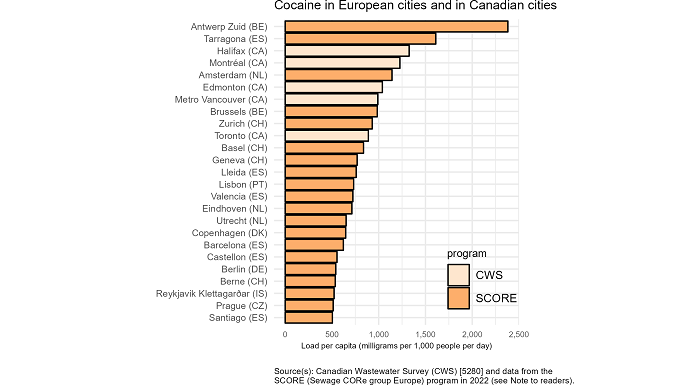
Cocaine in European and Canadian cities 2022 (Note: The X axis shows the amount of cocaine per capita measured in milligrams per 1,000 people per day, while the Y axis lists cities with populations over 100,000.)

Zuid, Antwerp in Belgium has the highest reported level, with 2,381 milligrams per 1,000 people daily. Following this, Tarragona, Spain has 1,611 milligrams, and Halifax, Canada shows 1,326 milligrams. Other notable cities include Montreal, Canada at 1,227 milligrams; Amsterdam, Netherlands at 1,142 milligrams; and Edmonton, Canada at 1,039 milligrams.

Metro Vancouver, Canada reports 991 milligrams, and Brussels, Belgium has 985 milligrams. Toronto, Canada has 890 milligrams, while Geneva, Switzerland reports 770 milligrams. Other cities with lower measurements include Valencia, Eindhoven, and Prague, showing a range from 724 to 513 milligrams per 1,000 people.

== See also ==
- List of countries by prevalence of opiates use
- List of countries by prevalence of cannabis use
