= List of countries by prevalence of opiates use =

This is a list of countries, and some territories, by the annual prevalence of opiates use as percentage of the population aged 15–64, unless otherwise indicated.

== Methodology ==
The primary source of information are the World Drug Report 2011 (WDR 2011) and the World Drug Report 2006 (WDR 2006), published by the United Nations Office on Drugs and Crime (UNODC). The indicator is the "annual prevalence" rate which is shown as the percentage of the youth and adult population who have consumed the drugs at least once in the past year. In 2009, the largest producer of opiates in the world was Afghanistan, with 93% of the world's market.

The list does not include opioids, classified as a different drug under the World Drug Report 2011 list, which is considered "opiates and prescription opioids."

== Nations ==
Country or Entity	Annual prevalence (percent)	Year	Sources and notes
Afghanistan	3.65	2015	
Iran	3.31	2015	
Russia	1.64	2007	
Maldives	1.34	2012	
Ukraine	1.16	2006	
Macau	1.1	2003	
United States of America	1.04	2016	
Kazakhstan	1.03	2015	
Pakistan	1.00	2012	
Malaysia	0.94	2009	
Uzbekistan	0.93	2015	
Mauritius	0.91	2007	
Kyrgyzstan	0.89	2015	
Estonia	0.81	2004	
Myanmar	0.8	2010	
Belarus	0.76	2016	
United Kingdom	0.73	2012	
Georgia	0.72	2010	
Ireland	0.72	2006	
Morocco	0.71	2017	
Nigeria	0.7	2008	
Luxembourg	0.59	2007	
Malta	0.59	2015	
Vietnam	0.53	2011	
Italy	0.52	2014	
Tajikistan	0.52	2015	
Denmark	0.52	2009	
France	0.52	2011	
Bulgaria	0.5	2011	
North Macedonia	0.5	2004	
Austria	0.5	2002	
Latvia	0.49	2016	
Portugal	0.49	2012	
Slovenia	0.49	2012	
Albania	0.45	2007	
Switzerland	0.43	2015	
South Africa	0.41	2008	
Zambia	0.4	2003	(UNODC estimates)
Canada	0.4	2000	" (Ontario, 18+)"
Belgium	0.4	1997	
Nepal	0.4	1996	
Czech Republic	0.4	2003	
India	0.4	2001	
Israel	0.40	2016	(18-65)
Laos	0.37	2008	
Bangladesh	0.37	2003	
Croatia	0.35	2012	
Turkmenistan	0.32	2007	
Angola	0.3	2001	(UNODC estimates)
Taiwan	0.3	2002	(UNODC estimates)
Bahrain	0.3	1998	
Iceland	0.3	1998	(UNODC estimates)
Sri Lanka	0.30	2016	
Chile	0.3	2010	(12-64)
Norway	0.27	2013	
Cyprus	0.25	2015	
Lithuania	0.24	2007	
Greece	0.23	2015	
Germany	0.22	2014	
Kenya	0.22	2012	
Spain	0.21	2014	
Thailand	0.20	2007	
Australia	0.20	2016	
Armenia	0.2	2007	
Somalia	0.2	2004	
Bahamas	0.2	2003	(UNODC estimates)
Democratic Republic of the Congo	0.2	2004	
Azerbaijan	0.2	2000	
Chad	0.2	1995	
Liberia	0.2	2004	
Sierra Leone	0.2	1997	
South Korea	0.2	2004	
Hong Kong	0.2	2004	
Indonesia	0.2	2002	(UNODC estimates)
China	0.2	2003	
Guatemala	0.2		(UNODC estimates)
Panama	0.2		(Tentative estimates)
Lebanon	0.2	2003	
Kuwait	0.2	2004	(UNODC estimates)
Jordan	0.2	2001	
Uruguay	0.2	2003	(UNODC estimates)
Poland	0.2	2002	
Romania	0.17	2016	
Netherlands	0.13	2012	
Slovakia	0.13	2008	
Hungary	0.13	2015	(18-64)
El Salvador	0.11	2005	
Barbados	0.11	2006	
Brazil	0.1	2016	
New Zealand	0.10	2008	
Argentina	0.1	2004	
Colombia	0.1	2004	(UNODC estimates)
Rwanda	0.1	2004	
Dominican Republic	0.1	2001	(12-70) (UNODC estimates)
Algeria	0.1	2004	(UNODC estimates)
Libya	0.1	2004	(UNODC estimates)
Thailand	0.1	2003	
Ghana	0.1	2004	
Republic of the Congo	0.1	2004	
Central African Republic	0.1	2004	
Niger	0.1	2004	
Japan	0.1	2002	
Costa Rica	0.1		(UNODC estimates)
Honduras	0.1	1995	
Mexico	0.1	2002	
Venezuela	0.1	2003	(UNODC estimates)
Ecuador	0.1	1999	(UNODC estimates)
Finland	0.1	2002	
Sweden	0.1	2001	
Oman	0.09	1999	
Yemen	0.09	1999	(Tentative estimates)
Moldova	0.07	2000	
Ethiopia	0.05		(Tentative estimates)
Uganda	0.05	2004	
Antigua and Barbuda	0.05	2000	
Turkey	0.05	2003	
Bolivia	0.07	2004	
Zimbabwe	0.04	2004	
Tunisia	0.03	2003	
Namibia	0.03	2000	
Senegal	0.08	2006	
Suriname	0.02	1998	
Tanzania	0.02	1998	
United Arab Emirates	0.02	2004	(UNODC estimates)
Syria	0.02	2005	
Cote d'Ivoire	0.01	1997	
Brunei Darussalam	0.01	1998	
Saudi Arabia	0.01	2000	
Qatar	0.01	1996	
Singapore	0.004	2004	

== See also ==
- Opium in Iran, highest per capita usage
- List of countries by prevalence of cocaine use
- List of countries by prevalence of cannabis use
