= Al McCoy =

Al McCoy may refer to:

- Al McCoy (announcer) (1933–2024), American radio broadcast announcer of Phoenix Suns NBA basketball games
- Al McCoy (baseball) (1928–2006), American baseball player
- Al McCoy (boxer), Alexander, (1894–1966), American boxer

== See also ==
- Alfred McCoy (disambiguation)
