= Afghan morphine =

Medical and economic proposal

Afghan morphine or "Poppy for Medicine" is an alternative development solution put forward to combat the poverty and public disenchantment caused by international counter-narcotics eradication policies in Afghanistan. Licensing opium poppy cultivation in order to locally manufacture and market Afghan morphine, according to this proposal, would create the economic conditions to empower poverty stricken rural Afghans and cut their ties with the illicit poppy trade.

Afghanistan is the world's leading producer of opium (82% of global opium production), cultivating 1,650 square kilometres of poppy and a potential 6,100 metric tons of opium in 2006, according to the UNODC World Drugs Report 2007. Afghanistan is also the source of the large majority of heroin seized in Europe. Since the US-led international intervention in 2001 to depose the Taliban, eradication programmes have been carried out by the Afghan government and their international backers, but since 2003, opium production in Afghanistan has risen sharply: the area cultivated in 2006 is 59% more than that cultivated in 2005. Equally, eradication and displacement have led to poverty among rural populations, as 2.9 million Afghans are involved in poppy cultivation. Eradication policies have, for many, led to a growing hostility among Afghans towards the government and international community who are seen to be destroying livelihoods by pursuing eradication policies.

== Poppy for medicine ==
One alternative development policy, put forward by the Senlis Council, proposes licensing poppy cultivation in order to make Afghan morphine and other poppy-based medicines and to avoid diversion of opium to illegal traffickers. Detailed in their June 2007 technical blueprint, "Poppy for Medicine", the Council propose that controlled poppy for medicine projects be established where the crop is cultivated, harvested and turned into essential medicines within the villages to limit diversion, add value to the finish product to promote economic diversification within the village and to guarantee the involvement of village inhabitants. The Council believes that the strong traditional local control systems, based around the village shura, supported by the Afghan National Army and international community, would control the legitimate production of poppy-based medicines and limit diversion. The economic resources created by the sale of the medicines would provide opportunities for the village to diversify and break ties with poppy cultivation and the illicit opium trade. A similar opium licensing scheme carried out in Turkey in the 1970s, with US support, brought illicit opium production under control within four years. Moreover, the proposal hopes that Afghan morphine can contribute to decreasing the acute global morphine shortage and provide cheap essential poppy-based medicines to countries who currently cannot afford to prescribe them.
