= Jorrit =

Jorrit is a West Frisian masculine given name derived via Jouwert (equivalent to Dutch Evert) from Everhard (German Eberhard). It is used throughout the Netherlands since the 1960s. People with this name include:

- Jorrit Salden (born 1990), Dutch TV personality
- Jorrit Bergsma (born 1986), Dutch speed skater
- Jorrit Bosch (born 1997), German politician
- Jorrit Croon (born 1998), Dutch field hockey player
- Jorrit Faassen (born 1980), Dutch businessman
- Jorrit Hendrix (born 1995), Dutch footballer
- Jorrit Kamminga (born 1976), Dutch political scientist
- Jorrit Kelder (born 1980), Dutch archaeologist and historian
- Jorrit Kunst (born 1989), Dutch footballer
- Jorrit de Ruiter (born 1986), Dutch badminton player
- Jorrit Smeets (born 1995), Dutch footballer
- Jorrit Tornquist (1938–2023), Austrian-Italian artist

== See also ==
- Jorit, Italian artist
