= Opium in Iran =

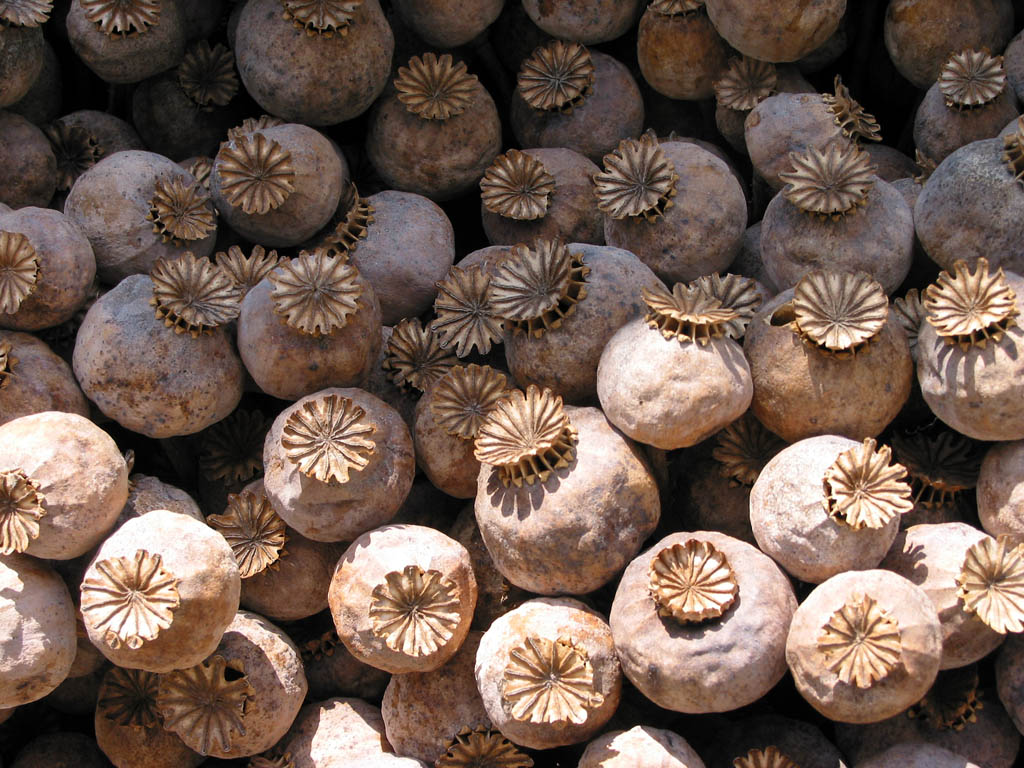
Harvested poppy capsules

Opium in Iran is widely available, and the country was estimated to have the highest per capita number of opioid addicts in the world at a rate of 2.8% of Iranians over age 15. The Iranian government estimated the number of addicts at 2 million. Opium and heroin from Afghanistan and Pakistan—known collectively as the Golden Crescent—pass through Iran's eastern borders in large amounts. In 2014, Iran burned 56 tons of Illicit Drugs on the International Day against Drug Abuse and Illicit Trafficking. The rate has fallen off since the Taliban started stopping the flow of opium.

== Extent ==
Total annual opium intercepts by the Iranian authorities are larger than in any other country. The Iranian government admits that they can only intercept a tiny proportion of the thousands of tonnes that are trafficked through Iran every year. Opium costs far less in Iran than in the West, and is cheaper than beer.

In Zahedan, an Iranian town near the Pakistani border, 3 grams of opium can be purchased for 10,000 Iranian rials, equivalent to less than ~$0.25 USD (based on an exchange rate of 42,000 IRR = US$1), and 1 kg costs the equivalent of ~$85. In Zabol, $1 buys 5 grams of Afghan opium. According to official Iranian government reports, within Tehran the daily consumption of opium is 4 metric tons. According to UNODC estimates, 450 metric tons of opium are consumed in Iran each year.

== Historical background ==
The first law in Iran regarding opium usage was introduced in 1911. The drug has a long history in Iran, dating back hundreds of years. In the 19th century, Iran began to significantly increase opium cultivation until it became Iran’s largest export. The consumption of opium increased in Iran relative to the growth in cultivation and export. Despite the initial attempts of the government to control usage and limit access for addicts, opium grew in production, usage and addiction rates.

== Post-revolution policy on opium ==
One of the major shifts after the 1979 revolution, in the state’s fight against drugs, was the introduction of Islam as the basis for anti-drug policies along with strong rhetoric from Ayatollah Ali Khomeini and other new Islamic judges. The war against drugs was taken up by the Islamic Republic with a renewed zeal, based on Khomeini’s specific vein of Islamic law.

As the new policies, strategies and institutions came in, the old western approaches, along with the experts of the Pahlavi era, were removed. With the removal of most of the leaders of the previous institutions, it fell on “parastatal entities” to attend to many of the societal crises. Ghiabi describes this change: “welfare priorities focused on religiously sanctioned areas of the social body, while Islamic/Khomeinist ideology demobilized humanitarian intervention for those deemed deviant. The political and religious establishment adopted a fierce rhetoric against drug users, accusing them of moral deviancy, anti-revolutionary behavior and westoxification (gharbzadegi)("Chah kasi").”

The Islamic Republic employed a specific rhetorical strategy in its efforts to eliminate opium—specifically, drawing comparisons and associating alcohol with opium. This proved to be an effective approach due to Islam’s explicit prohibition of alcohol. Ghiabi highlights how this position on opium was distinct to post-revolutionary rhetoric, and not the standard in Iran’s history of Islamic law. He states, “The juxtaposition of these two bans was unusual in Islamic jurisdiction, which, in most cases, had remained silent on the matter of opium. Indeed, the clerical approach to drugs before the revolution was remarkable for its lack of condemnation, even more so in view of the widespread use of waqf lands in the opium economy up to the mid-twentieth century”.

One of the most significant figures of the post-revolutionary era of anti-drug policies, is Sadegh Khalkhali. On the 10th of May 1980, Khalkhali was appointed to the position “supervisor of the Office of the Fight against Drugs…”, which in turn, “ gave the final push to the purifying endeavor”. Khalkhali was known for his iron-fisted approach to criminal punishment, from which he developed a reputation for fervent support of executing criminals.

During his time as the judge of the revolutionary courts, Khalkhali led an aggressive campaign against opium, establishing a new range of punishments for all levels of opium-related crimes. Ghiabi states, “Khalkhali took the lead in a massive state-led repression against drug traffickers (from petty criminals to mafia bosses), drug abusers (in particular against street vagabonds and the homeless)”.

The Islamic Republic was determined to reshape the public perception on opium use and its severe consequences, and Khalkhali was the face of this new campaign. Iran’s government decided to make it clear that there would be no tolerance for drugs or their addicts in the society. To accomplish this end, “public executions and TV confessions were employed as means of deterrence and education for the populace, signaling a change in the technology of power in relation to punishment. Khalkhali's performance as Iran's drug czar had regular coverage in the Media...”

== Drugs in Iranian pop culture ==
The long history of opium usage and addiction in Iran has left its mark on the society, with world-high addiction rates, and large numbers of incarcerated people. This societal dilemma has been represented frequently in Iranian pop-culture and cinema. The topic of addiction has been central to films such as Santouri, and shows such as Lisanseha.

In Santouri, the main character is a musician whose career and marriage fall apart as a result of his addiction to drugs. He loses his place as a well-respected musician and ends up on the streets, unable to shake his addiction. Lisanseha, a comedy show, presents numerous comments and social critiques on the pervasive and destructive effects of drugs in Iranian society. One of the main characters is a young man, Maziar, whose middle-aged father is an addict, which creates many obstacles to Maziar’s prospects and future.

In addition to including a character with a drug addiction, the show also contains many scenes which satirically highlight realities of drugs in Iranian culture. In one scene, one of the characters simply mentions that he wonders if any drug dealers are in the area. After quietly making this comment, he is approached from all sides as the street floods with cyclists and cars, all of whom are indicated to be drug dealers soliciting their products. These are just a few examples drawn from Iranian cinema that exemplify the broader pop culture perception of opium in Iranian society.

== Iran's anti-drug trafficking acts ==
=== 2018 ===
In 2018, the Islamic Republic of Iran's Chief Justice issued a judicial order that modified the nation's stringent laws regarding drug trafficking. The 14th Senior Officials Meeting and the 9th Ministerial Meeting were organized by UNODC in partnership with the Governments of the Islamic Republics of Iran and Pakistan as part of the UNODC-facilitated Triangular Initiative. The meetings took place in Tehran, Islamic Republic of Iran on 13-14 June 2023.

== See also ==
- 2010 Khorasan shootout
- CIA transnational anti-crime and anti-drug activities
- Golden Crescent
- Opium production in Afghanistan

General:

- Crime in Iran
- Health care in Iran
- Illegal drug trade
- List of countries by prevalence of opiates use
