= 2010 Khorasan shootout =

Shootout between Iranian police and drug smugglers

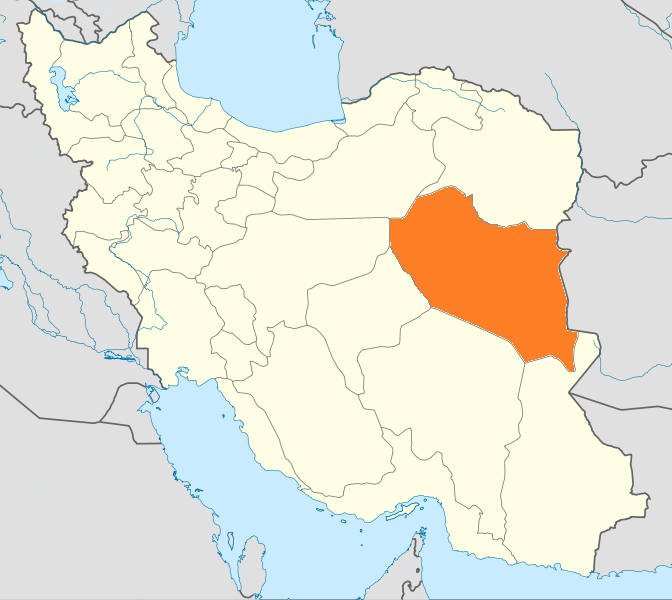
- South Khorasan province
- Location: South Khorasan province, Iran
- Date: 2 January 2010
- Attack type: Shootout
- Deaths: 10
- Injuries: 4
- Perpetrator: Iranian drug smugglers
- Defender: Iranian police

The 2010 Khorasan shootout occurred on January 2, 2010, when Iranian police executing a drug raid were fired upon by drug smugglers near the Iran-Afghanistan border. At least 10 Iranian police were killed; 7 died at the scene and three more died later as a result of injuries sustained during the shooting.

Reports also indicated that 4 additional Iranian policemen were also seriously injured in the shootout, and two drug smugglers were killed.

== See also ==
- Opium production in Afghanistan
