= Opium licensing =

Opium licensing is a policy instrument used to counter illegal drug cultivation and production. It has been used in countries such as Turkey and India to curb illegal opium production. The main mechanism used under opium licensing is a shift from cultivation and/or production for the illegal market towards legal uses such as the production of essential medicines such as morphine and codeine.

== Proposal for Afghanistan ==
Currently, an international think tank called The International Council on Security and Development (ICOS), formerly known as The Senlis Council, is investigating whether this policy option could be used to solve the massive drug problem in Afghanistan. The organization is calling for a new village-based poppy for medicines system that would be able to boost rural development, create stability and increase the grip the Karzai administration has on isolated poppy growing areas in the country. Equally, cheap Afghan-made could respond to the acute shortage of poppy-based medicines internationally. In June 2007, the Council released a technical blueprint for a poppy for medicine project in Afghanistan and called for a pilot project to create Afghan Morphine to be put in place at the next planting season (see The Senlis Council: "Poppy for Medicine" Poppy for Medicine)

=== Counterarguments ===
The Bush administration objected to ICOS's recommendations. In February 2007, the U.S. Department of State, through the Bureau of International Narcotics and Law Enforcement Affairs, issued a response to the ICOS's proposal. They argued that the price difference between licit and illicit poppies would discourage farmers from participating, a problem that could be overcome only by massive subsidies. The United Nations International Narcotics Control Board finds little to no unmet demand for licit Afghan poppies in international markets. While Turkey, India, Pakistan, and Bolivia have adopted similar plans, decades of conflict have left most of Afghanistan country radically underdeveloped, both economically and institutionally. Large portions of the country remain largely under the control of Taliban insurgents, and these conditions pose serious difficulties for a successful licensing program.
