= Menno T. Kamminga =

Dutch international law scholar (born 1949)

Menno Tjeerd Kamminga (born 1949) is a Dutch international law scholar and emeritus Professor of International Law at Maastricht University, known for work in the field of Human Rights treaties, obligations accountability, and universal jurisdiction.

Kamminga graduated from Groningen University in 1973, and another master's degree in international law and international relations from The Fletcher School at Tufts University in 1974. In 1978 he started as a Legal Adviser at the International Secretariat of Amnesty International in London, where he served until 1987.

Kamminga obtained his PhD from the University of Leiden in 1990, with the thesis Inter-State Accountability of Violation of Human Rights, published by the University of Pennsylvania. Manfred Nowak (1994) wrote that Kamminga "dealt with one of the most difficult and controversial question of human rights law: the antagonistic relationship between the international protection of human rights and the principle of non-intervention into internal affairs of sovereign states."

Kamminga started out at the Erasmus University Rotterdam, where he was a senior lecturer in International Law from 1987 until 2000. He then moved to Maastricht University, where he was a Professor of International Law and Director of the Maastricht Centre for Human Rights until 2014.

== Publications, a selection ==
- Kamminga, Menno T. (1992). Inter-State Accountability of Violation of Human Rights. University of Pennsylvania, U.S.: University of Pennsylvania Press. pp. 19–198. ISBN 978-0-8122-3176-2.
- Menno Kamminga and Martin Scheinin (eds.): The Impact of Human Rights Law on General International Law. Oxford University Press 2009
