= Opium Season =

2007 book by Joel Hafvenstein

Opium Season: A Year on the Afghan Frontier
- Cover of US edition
- Author: Joel Hafvenstein
- Cover artist: Georgianna Goodwin
- Language: English
- Subject: Afghanistan, opium trade, travel
- Publisher: The Lyons Press
- Publication date: November 1, 2007
- Publication place: United States
- Media type: Print (Hardcover)
- Pages: 336
- ISBN: 978-1-59921-131-2
- OCLC: 148949291
- Dewey Decimal: 958.104/7 22
- LC Class: DS371.4 .H32 2007

Opium Season is the true story of a young American in Afghanistan running an aid program to counter the opium trade.

== Plot ==
Joel Hafvenstein signed up for a year in Afghanistan in the heart of the country's opium trade, running an American-funded aid program to help thousands of opium poppy farmers make a legal living, and to win hearts and minds away from the former Taliban government. The author was soon caught up in the machinations of Helmand's drug trafficking warlords.

== Sources ==
- Official book site
- More about the book, Opium Season
- The New York Times book review
- On Line Opinion - Australia book review
- Joel Hafvenstein video interview on The Interviewpoint: part 1, part 2
