= Cristina Durán =

Spanish illustrator and cartoonist (born 1970)

Cristina Durán Costell
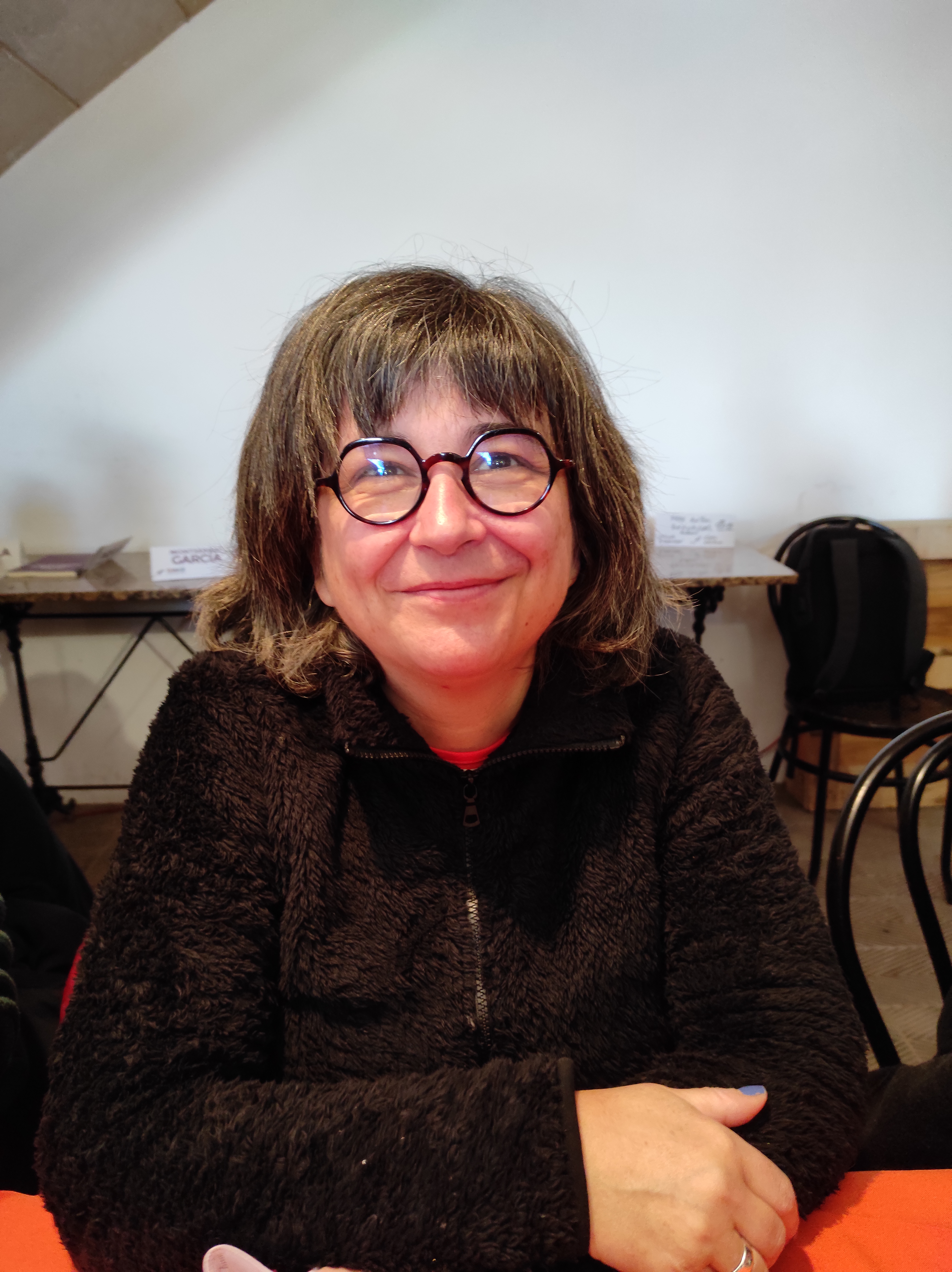
- Born: 1970 (age 55–56); Valencia, Spain
- Known for: Illustrations; cartoons

Cristina Durán Costell (born 1970, Valencia) is an illustrator and cartoonist. She graduated in the faculty of Fine Arts of Valencia with speciality in Drawing. While she studied she created the fanzine No Aparcar Llamo GRUA with Miguel Ángel Giner, Robin and Alberto Botella. Later, in 1993 these four people created the company LaGRUAestudio, focused on the illustration of books and advertisements, comic and animation. She worked to reactivate the Asociación Profesional de Ilustradores de Valencia (APIV) in 1997, and she was its president between the years 2006 and 2009. She also has been a member of the Board of directors of the Federación de Asociaciones de Ilustradores Profesionales (FADIP) and of the founding board of the European Illustrators Forum (EIF).

Her first graphic novel with Miguel Ángel Giner named Una posibilidad entre mil was published the year 2009 by Ediciones Sins Entido. In September 2011 an expanded third edition was published, including a prologue written by Eduard Punset. Durán and Giner Bou narrated their daughter Laia's first three years which mainly took place in hospitals and rehabilitation centers. The same year, Boja per tu, a comic edited by the Ministry of Health, Social Politics and Equality was published. In 2012, the graphic novel La máquina de Efrén was published. It is the second part of the story and describes the adoption of their second daughter. She also wrote short comic stories such as Usted está aquí, Arròs negre and Cómic. She also teaches in the Master in design and illustration at the faculty of Fine Arts of Valencia. The last comic published is El bote de mermelada, included in the project Viñetas de vida by Oxfam, along with work from ten Spanish authors.

== Awards and nominations ==
- Finalist of the Reward National of Cómic submitted by the Ministry of Culture for Una posibilidad entre mil (2010)
- Finalist of the Reward National of Cómic submitted by the Ministry of Education, Culture and Sports for La máquina de Efrén (2013)
- Nominated in the 1st Trophée "The Bds qui font la différence sur les personnes en situation de handicap" of the association Sans Tambour ni Trompette and the International Festival of the Bande Dessinée of Angoulême for Una posibilidad entre mil (2011)
- Prize Turia to the best cultural contribution to comics for Una posibilidad entre mil and La máquina de Efrén (2012)
- Honorific Silver Medal from Benetússer (2014)
- Prize Flash-Back for Una posibilidad entre mil and La máquina de Efrén (2013)
- Finalist to the Dolem's Critics' Award in the categories of best national and best work script for La máquina de Efrén (2012)
- Nominated for the best Spanish author at the 31st International Barcelona Comic Convention for La máquina de Efrén (2013)

== Works ==
- Una posibilidad entre mil with Miguel Ángel Giner (2009)
- Boja per tu with Miguel Ángel Giner (2011)
- La máquina de Efrén with Miguel Ángel Giner (2012)
- El Segle d'Or Valencià with Miguel Ángel Giner (2014)
- Obreras from Enjambres (2014)
- Ondas en el río with Miguel Ángel Giner from the collective work Viñetas de vida from Oxfam Intermón (2nd edition published by Astiberri) Available in the free mobile application Comic on tour.
- Cuando no sabes qué decir with Miguel Ángel Giner (2015)
