= Alfred McCoy =

Alfred McCoy may refer to:

- Alfred McCoy (American football) (1899–1990), American college sports coach
- Alfred W. McCoy (born 1945), American historian

== See also ==
- Al McCoy (disambiguation)
