= 1903 Isfahan anti-Baháʼí riots =

Event

The 1903 Isfahan anti-Baháʼí riots refers to a series of events that led to the massacre of Baháʼí's in the city of Isfahan in Qajar Iran. The events were centered on the Russian consulate in the city.

== Context ==
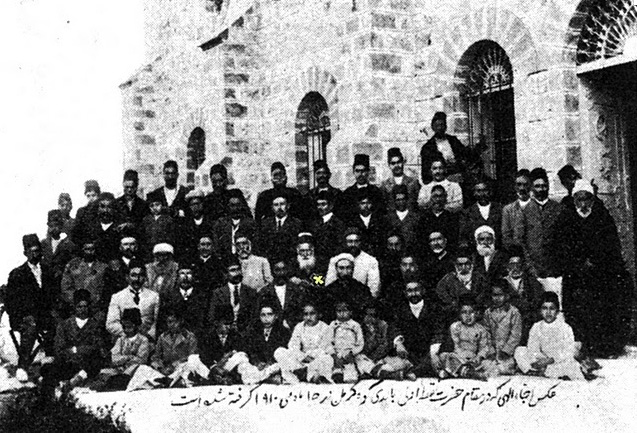
A group of Baháʼís in Iran in 1910

As early as the 1840s, there had been anti-Bábi and later anti-Baháʼí riots in Iran. These sorts of persecution happened in some cities more than others due to involvement of religious leaders or the visibility of Bábi and Baháʼí communities. In addition to the city of Yazd, Isfahan had often been plagued by such riots. In 1903, during one of these episodic attacks, Baháʼí's tried to take sanctuary in the Russian consulate in Isfahan. The attacks, which took place over an eight-month period (1902–1903), had been prompted by the visit of Qajar prince Mirza Abol-Hasan Khan Shaykh ol-Ra'is to Isfahan. In addition to being a prince of Iran's ruling dynasty, Shaykh ol-Ra'is was also a mojtahed and one of the most renowned clerics at the time.

When Shaykh ol-Ra'is approached Isfahan, two wealthy Isfahani Baháʼí's, namely Agha Mohammad Javad who was the sarraf, i.e., "money lender" of the treasury and Mirza Ali Khan, the treasury's accountant (mostowfi) were in his service. However, the most renowned cleric of Isfahan, Agha Najafi, and other mojtaheds ignored and disrespected him. Agha Mohammad Javad and other sarrafs were also engaged in other Baháʼí matters; they, for example, rescued Baháʼí's from Agha Najafi and his men. To make matters more complicated, Shaykh ol-Ra'is's sermons were considered to be popular during his month of stay in Isfahan, and his presence and preaching provided the members of the Baháʼí community with confidence and renewed activism.

On 23 May 1903, a large number of Isfahani Baháʼí's, including Agha Mohammad Javad and Mirza Ali Khan, attended the funeral service of another Baháʼí money exchanger, known as Hajji Mohammad Esmail. When Agha Najafi heard about this, he sent a band of theology students (tollab) and vigilantes (lutis) to Agha Mohammad Javad and Mirza Ali Khan. The group of tollabs and lutis managed to catch Agha Mohammad Javad, and he was subsequently detained and tortured. Although without proof, Najafi argued that Javad was a Bábi, and that he had seen him drinking wine two years prior and therefore had to be punished with eighty lashes. Ali Khan had managed to escape.

On the night of 23 May 1903, the Isfahani Baháʼí's discussed the events and prepared an account for Baronovski, the acting Russian consul in Isfahan. The Russian consul allowed the Baháʼí's to take sanctuary (bast) in the Russian consulate of Isfahan; some 200 Baháʼí's followed the call. The next day, 24 May, Baronovski told Baháʼí's from Abadeh, Najafabad and Seda to take refuge in the consulate as well, and within a short period of time, the number of Baháʼí's in the consulate had increased to 600 or 700. From the consulate, petitions were telegraphed to Mozaffar al-Din Shah Qajar (r. 1896–1907) in the capital Tehran as well as the prime minister and other state officials. The responses from Tehran were not satisfactory however, and thus Baronovski himself corresponded with Mass'oud Mirza Zell-e Soltan, then governor of Isfahan. Zell-e Soltan managed to assure and convince Mirza Ali Khan and other Baháʼí to move out of the consulate on the evening of 27 May 1903. Mirza Ali Khan and Agha Mohammad Javad were then under the protection of Zell-e Soltan, who helped them to escape to Tehran.

Then, rumors began to spread that Agha Najafi had ordered for the destruction of the Russian consulate and to murder the "Bábi's". On Friday 28 May 1903, some men surrounded the Russian consulate during the night. Mirza Ahmad Khan Fateh ol-Molk, the Iranian foreign office agent (kargozar), brought Agha Najafi to the environs of the consulate and informed the crowd to listen to what Agha Najafi ordered. The men slowly but surely withdrew from the Russian consulate with Najafi telling them gently to go about their own affairs. Realizing the change of events, the Russian consul Baronovski moved all the Baháʼí's out of the consulate and told them that he was unable to provide them with additional help. As the excited crowd had not entirely dispersed from the consulate, when the Baháʼí's moved out, they attacked them, and beat them to death. They also stole their belongings. The violence against the Baháʼí's continued for several days, with continued public disorder. Many Baháʼí's who had previously kept a low profile, but now thought that they were in a safe situation to join the Baháʼí refugees, were now easy targets of attack. It would take just two months after these events centered on Isfahan and the Russian consulate for another anti-Baháʼí episode to occur (this time in Yazd).

== See also ==
- Persecution of Baháʼís

== Sources ==
- Sadeghian, Saghar (2016). "Minorities and Foreigners in a Provincial Iranian City: Bahāʾis in the Russian Consulate of Isfahan in 1903". Journal of Persianate Studies. 9 (1): 107–132. doi:10.1163/18747167-12341297.
