= Golden Crescent =

One of Asia's two principal areas of illicit drug production

The Golden Crescent is the name given to one of Asia's two principal areas of illicit opium production, with the other being the Golden Triangle. Located at the crossroads of Central, South, and West Asia, this space covers the mountainous peripheries of Afghanistan and Pakistan, extending into eastern Iran.

In 2007, the United Nations Office on Drugs and Crime (UNODC) heroin production estimates for the past 10 years showed significant changes in the primary source areas. In 1991, Afghanistan became the world's primary opium producer, with a yield of 1,782 metric tons (U.S. State Department estimates), surpassing Myanmar, formerly the world leader in opium production. The decrease in heroin production from Myanmar is the result of several years of unfavorable growing conditions and new government policies of forced eradication.

Afghan heroin production increased during the same time frame, with a notable decrease in 2001 allegedly as a result of the Taliban's fatwa against heroin production. Afghanistan has produced over 90% of the world's illicit opium in the recent past. In addition to opiates, Afghanistan was also the world's largest producer of hashish during that time. Opium production and trafficking are known to have funded the Taliban's military activities and insurgency.

== History ==
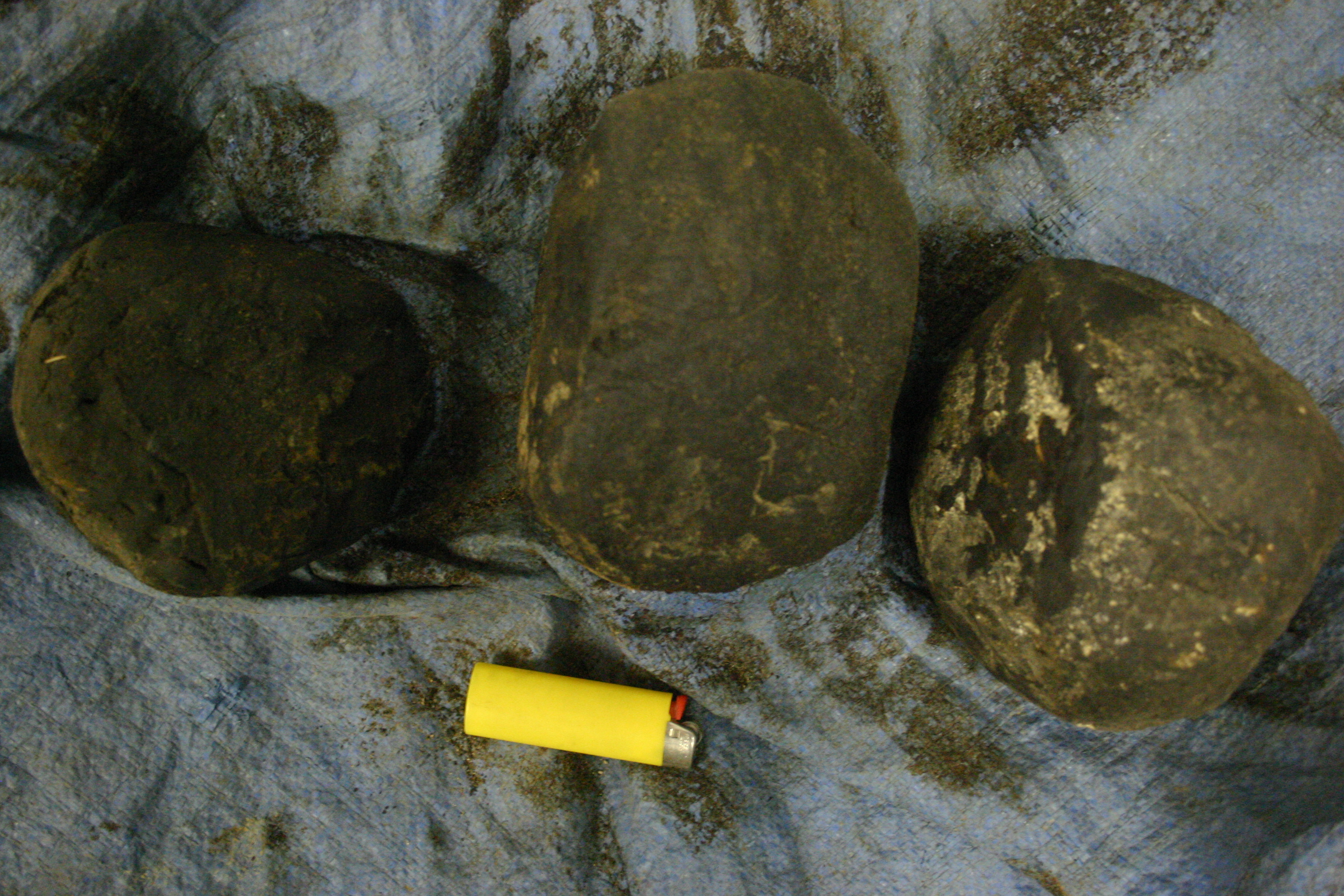
Black tar opium seized in Afghanistan, 2005

The Golden Crescent has a much longer history of opium production than Southeast Asia's Golden Triangle. The Golden Triangle emerged as a modern-day opium-producing entity only in the 1980s, after the Golden Crescent had done so in the 1950s. The Golden Triangle began making an impact on the opium and morphine market in the 1980s and has steadily increased its output since then in order to match the increasing demand. During the invasion of Afghanistan in 2001, a retaliation to the September 11th terrorist attacks, the Golden Crescent's opium production took a huge hit, producing almost 90% less opium than in 2000.

At the peak of its opium production in 2007, the Golden Crescent produced more than 8,000 of the world's almost 9,000 total tons of opium, a near monopoly. The Golden Crescent also dominates the cannabis resin market due to the high resin yields of the region (145 kg/ha), four times more than Morocco (36 kg/ha). The Golden Crescent also caters to a much larger market, about 64% more than the Golden Triangle. It produces and distributes over 2,500 tons of opiates to Africa, Europe, the Americas and Central Asia and supplies almost 9.5 million opiate users worldwide.

Despite worldwide efforts to capture and to seize as much opium product as possible, total opiate seizures brought in only 23.5% of the total estimated product distributed worldwide. Of these seizures around 97% of opium and morphine seizures are made in the Middle East and heroin seizures are made mostly in India, the Middle East and Europe.

In Afghanistan, only 1% of the heroin that is exported illegally is intercepted and destroyed by the national governments. Although Afghanistan is the major producer of opiates in the Golden Crescent, most of the seizures are made in Iran. This is because traffickers are arrested while crossing the border from Afghanistan to Iran so that they can distribute the product to Europe and Africa where there is a high demand for opiates.

In Pakistan, the majority of traffickers arrested are 38% Nigerians and 32% Pakistanis. These traffickers, essential to the transportation of the drugs from the source to end-user markets, make large profits because of how risky the job is. A rough estimate of how many people are currently involved in drug trafficking is above one million. The majority of opium produced in Afghanistan comes from Helmand and Kandahar provinces. Of the 5,300 tons of opium produced in Afghanistan, 2,700 tons is transformed into heroin. In 2008, almost half of the heroin produced was used in Iran. Even though Afghanistan is the leading producer, only 7% was used there.

== Markets ==
A map of the world's main opium cultivation area

Although the Golden Triangle heroin dominates the Asian illegal drug markets, the Golden Crescent is increasingly becoming a source of illicit drugs trafficked into western China, particularly the nearby Xinjiang Province.

== See also ==
- Opium production in Afghanistan
- Golden Triangle
- Drug cartel
- Opium in Iran
- Crime in Pakistan
