= Jorrit Kamminga =

Dutch political scientist (born 1976)

- Born: 1976 (age 49–50)
- Education: University of Valencia
- Known for: Research on security and development in Afghanistan and Colombia, policy analysis, and advocacy
- Notable work: Afghanistan, Land of Wonders, Thanks for Nothing Bin Laden: 20 Years of the Netherlands in Afghanistan, Zahra: A Policewoman in Afghanistan
- Scientific career
- Fields: Political Science, International Relations
- Workplaces: RAIN Defense + AI, Netherlands Institute of International Relations Clingendael, Oxfam
- Thesis: Towards an International Economic Security Regime for Alternative Development in Illicit Drug-Producing Countries (2014)

Jorrit Kamminga (born 1976) is Senior Consultant for Policy at RAINCLOUD, a global business and knowledge hub for the Defense + AI ecosystem. He specializes in AI ethics, global governance, and how responsible AI can be developed within the dual use and defense related industries.

== Early life and education ==
Kamminga earned his Ph.D. in International Relations from the Faculty of Constitutional Law, Political Science, and Administration at the University of Valencia in July 2014.

== Career ==
=== Academic and Research Focus ===
Dr. Kamminga specializes in the nexus between security and development, focusing particularly on Afghanistan and Colombia. He has worked as a research consultant for several organizations, including:

- The United Nations Office on Drugs and Crime (UNODC)
- The German development agency GIZ
- The Dutch Ministry of Foreign Affairs

He was an Associate Fellow at the Netherlands Institute of International Relations Clingendael between February 2012 and March 2023.

=== Professional Experience ===
After working in the political section of the Dutch Embassy in Madrid and with the International Council on Security and Development (ICOS) in Paris, London, Kabul, Kandahar and Lashkar Gah, Dr. Kamminga joined Oxfam. For more than six years, he worked for Oxfam in various positions, specializing in conflict transformation, inclusive peace and inclusive security in Afghanistan, Pakistan, Palestine, South Sudan, Syria and Yemen.

In January 2021 he left Oxfam and joined RAIN Defense + AI, the company behind RAINCLOUD, initially as Director of the Ethics division. Within RAINCLOUD, Kamminga actively shapes the discourse on preserving meaningful AI ethics amidst rapid technological advancements and geopolitical competition.

== Media and Publications ==
=== Documentary Work ===
In addition to his research, policy analysis and advocacy work, in 2009 Dr. Kamminga produced the documentary Afghanistan, Land of Wonders, about the experiences of Russian veterans (Afgantsy in Russian) during the Soviet invasion.

In 2011, he worked on Angry Young Men?, a four-episode series of videos about the inspirations and challenges of Afghan youth in Kabul and beyond.

=== Graphic Stories and Books ===
In 2020, Dr. Kamminga worked on the story and script of the graphic story Zahra: A policewoman in Afghanistan. For that publication, he worked together with Cristina Durán and Miguel Ángel Giner, a Spanish artistic couple who won the Spanish Comic Prize in 2019.

In 2021, his Dutch book ‘Thanks for nothing Bin Laden: 20 years of the Netherlands in Afghanistan’ was published by Jalapeño Books.
