= Madak =

Chinese blend of opium and tobacco

Madak was a blend of opium and tobacco used as a recreational drug in 16th- and 17th-century China. It emerged in southern coastal areas in the first half of the 17th century. In the last quarter of the 18th century madak was phased out by raw opium. The prohibition of madak in 1729 may have been a contributing factor to the increase in popularity of smoking pure opium.

Raw opium was introduced in China by Arab merchants. Rather than taking bitter raw opium orally, the Chinese attempted smoking opium mixed with other substances. According to Dikotter et al., smoking opium blended with tobacco was introduced in China by the Dutch traders between 1624 and 1660. Madak was prepared by blending opium from Java with domestic Chinese hemp and herbs, boiling the mix in pans and, finally, mixing with tobacco. It was smoked in bamboo pipes with coir fibre filter. The new addiction was limited to coastal territories around Taiwan Strait; further spread was hampered by the civil war that accompanied the fall of the Ming Dynasty. The new Qing Dynasty government was not aware of madak until 1683. The lucrative opium business continued spreading along the coast of Southern China, although exact chronology of this spread remains unknown.

By 1720 the government saw madak smoking as a social evil that has corrupted not just the lowest classes, but the "good families" too. Smoking dens, where people congregated at night, were deemed as dangerous as heretical cults and political conspiracies. In 1729 the Yongzheng Emperor banned recreational smoking of madak. Medicinal use remained permitted. According to Dikotter et al., the prohibition targeted madak smoking not as such, but as a dangerous form of unacceptable social life feared by the Forbidden City (and thus was akin to A Counterblaste to Tobacco written a century earlier by James I of England). Madak had a "very narrow consumer base" confined to Fujian, Guangdong and Taiwan. Peak consumption, according to Dutch records, was under 12 tonnes of opium per annum.

The British East India Company (EIC) complied with the ban until 1780; Portuguese merchant ships continued small-scale deliveries of "medicinal" opium. In 1780 the East India Company faced a dire financial crisis and resorted to opium smuggling . Their opium did not sell at all: only 15% of the English shipment found customers within China. However, in the next two decades consumption of opium rapidly grew. The Chinese replaced madak with raw opium; madak remained in limited use by the Malay people. In 1793 the EIC assumed a monopoly on now profitable opium trade into China. The Chinese government banned opium in 1796, temporarily driving the market underground. Historian Xiao Yishan reasoned that the surge in opium consumption was directly influenced by the 1729 prohibition. According to Dikotter et al., exact causes of the change remain unknown.

== See also ==
- History of opium in China
