= Narcotoline =

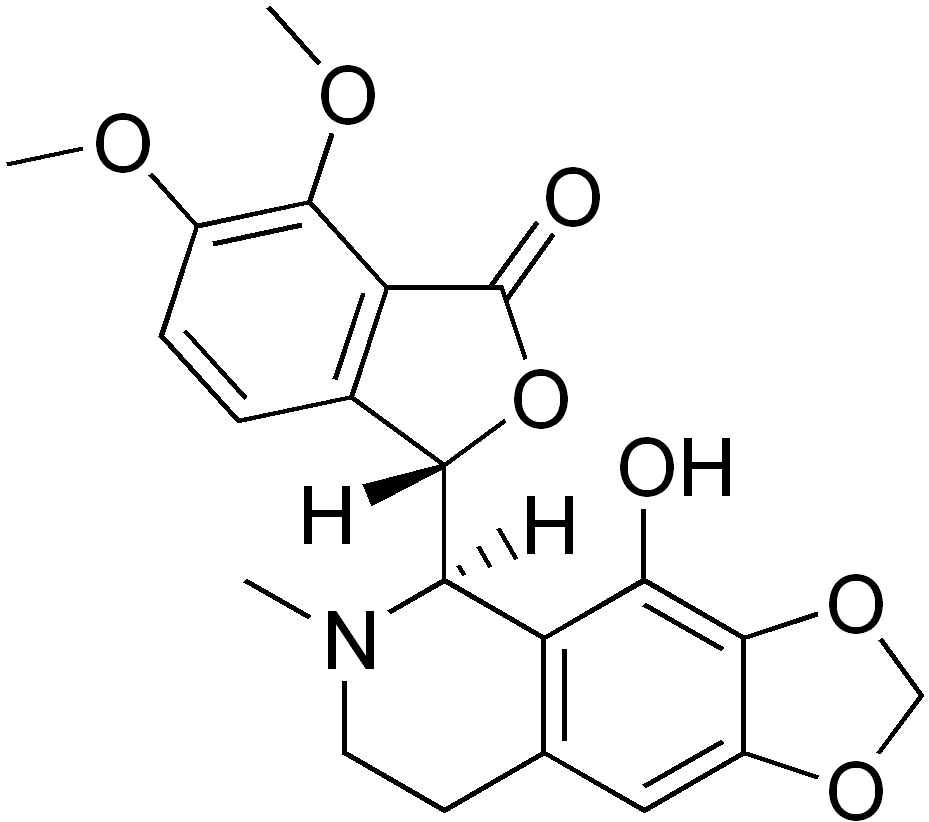

Names
- Preferred IUPAC name (3S)-3-[(5R)-4-Hydroxy-6-methyl-5,6,7,8-tetrahydro-2H-[1,3]dioxolo[4,5-g]isoquinolin-5-yl]-6,7-dimethoxy-2-benzofuran-1(3H)-one

Identifiers
CAS Number	521-40-4
3D model (JSmol)	Interactive image
ChemSpider	390785
ECHA InfoCard	100.007.559
EC Number	208-313-6
KEGG	C09593
PubChem CID	442330
UNII	M5V1K1QE3F
CompTox Dashboard (EPA)	DTXSID50200098
- InChI: InChI=1S/C21H21NO7/c1-22-7-6-10-8-13-20(28-9-27-13)17(23)14(10)16(22)18-11-4-5-12(25-2)19(26-3)15(11)21(24)29-18/h4-5,8,16,18,23H,6-7,9H2,1-3H3/t16-,18+/m1/s1 Key: LMGZCSKYOKDBES-AEFFLSMTSA-N; InChI=1/C21H21NO7/c1-22-7-6-10-8-13-20(28-9-27-13)17(23)14(10)16(22)18-11-4-5-12(25-2)19(26-3)15(11)21(24)29-18/h4-5,8,16,18,23H,6-7,9H2,1-3H3/t16-,18+/m1/s1 Key: LMGZCSKYOKDBES-AEFFLSMTBE
- SMILES: CN1CCC2=CC3=C(C(=C2[C@@H]1[C@@H]4C5=C(C(=C(C=C5)OC)OC)C(=O)O4)O)OCO3

Properties
Chemical formula	C_{21}H_{21}NO_{7}
Molar mass	399.399 g·mol^{−1}
- Except where otherwise noted, data are given for materials in their standard state (at 25 °C [77 °F], 100 kPa). verify (what is ?) Infobox references

Narcotoline is an opiate alkaloid chemically related to noscapine. It binds to the same receptors in the brain as noscapine to act as an antitussive, and has also been used in tissue culture media.

== Sources ==
It can be obtained from the opium poppy, Papaver somniferum. It is present at much higher levels in culinary strains (cultivars) of P. somniferum used for poppy seed production than in high-morphine pharmaceutical strains used for opium production.
