= Xiao Yishan =

Chinese historian (1902–1978)

- 蕭一山
- Born: 7 May 1902; Tongshan, Jiangsu, Qing China
- Died: 4 July 1978; Taipei, Taiwan
- Education: Peking University
- Occupation: historian

Xiao Yishan (蕭一山, 7 May 1902 – 4 July 1978) was a modern Chinese historian.

== Biography ==
Xiao Yishan entered Peking University in 1921, learned from the prominent scholar Liang Qichao. He later taught history of Qing Dynasty at Tsinghua University, Henan University, Northeastern University and Northwest University. In winter 1948, Xiao moved to Taiwan. General History of the Qing Dynasty (《清代通史》) is his masterpiece, in that book he promoted a historical view of nationalism.
