= Gulbenkian =

Gulbenkian (Armenian: Կիւլպէնկեան) is an Armenian surname. It may refer to:

== People ==
- Calouste Gulbenkian, an Armenian businessman
- Nubar Gulbenkian, his son, also a businessman
- Angela Gulbenkian, an art collector
- Kémar Gulbenkian, member of French group No One Is Innocent

== Other ==
- Calouste Gulbenkian Foundation, a charitable institution
- Instituto Gulbenkian de Ciência, a research facility also known as the Gulbenkian Science Institute
- Calouste Gulbenkian Museum, a museum in Lisbon, Portugal
- Gulbenkian Prize, series of awards for museums and galleries, for sciences, human rights
- Gulbenkian Ballet, a ballet troupe (1965–2005)
- Gulbenkian Theatre, a theatre in Canterbury, England
- Gulbenkian Orchestra, an orchestra in Lisbon
- Gulbenkian Park, also known as Gulbenkian Garden, garden with lakes located in Lisbon
- Avenida Calouste Gulbenkian, a major avenue in Lisbon
