= Centre of excellence (disambiguation) =

Centre of excellence or center of excellence may refer to:

- Australian Research Council (ARC) Centres of Excellence, Australian and international research collaborations
- BA Centre of Excellence, a basketball program in Australia
- Center of excellence, a team, shared facility or an organizational entity that concentrates on a focus area
- Centre of Excellence on Public Security (CEPS), a think tank based in Rio de Janeiro, Brazil
- Cenex, the UK Centre of Excellence for Low Carbon and fuel cell technologies
- CERT Group of Companies, the Centre of Excellence for Applied Research and Training
- Commonwealth Bank Centre of Excellence, the name for the Australian Cricket Academy
- CECT, the Central Institute of Classical Tamil, established by the government of India with a view to promoting the cause of Classical Tamil
- Centre of Excellence for Biosecurity Risk Analysis (CEBRA), Melbourne, Australia
- EU CBRN Risk Mitigation CoE Initiative, the EU Centres of Excellence on Chemical, Biological, Radiological and Nuclear Risk Mitigation (CBRN CoE)
- NATO Centres of Excellence, an initiative of NATO to request the NATO nations to set up think tank, knowledge development centres
