= State Security Service of Georgia =

State intelligence agency of Georgia

- საქართველოს სახელმწიფო უსაფრთხოების სამსახური
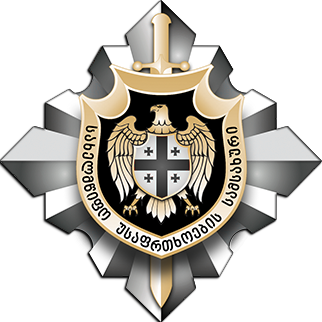

Agency overview
- Formed: 1918-1921; Reinstated as separate entity on 1 August 2015
- Preceding agency: State Security Agency of the MIA
- Jurisdiction: Georgia, not limited to – in cooperation with international agencies
- Employees: Classified
- Annual budget: Classified
- Agency executive: Geka Geladze, Chief of the Security Service
- Website: http://ssg.gov.ge/en

The State Security Service of Georgia (SSSG; Georgian: სახელმწიფო უსაფრთხოების სამსახური [SUS]) is a state security agency of Georgia, under the authority of the Government, which covers a broad spectrum of tasks to preserve national security in accordance to state legislature and relevant laws. Its missions are to protect the constitutional order, sovereignty, territorial integrity and military potential of Georgia from illegal acts of special services and individuals of foreign countries; to prevent violent and unconstitutional change of order and state authority. Further it is to ensure economic security and fight terrorism on national and international level, transnational organized crime and international crime as well as carry out measures towards prevention, detection and suppression of corruption.

The agency is also responsible for protecting state secrets. The newly established independent agency is a former subordinate branch of the Ministry of Internal Affairs of Georgia and has been re-activated in 2015.

The chief of the agency reports directly to the Prime Minister.

== Origins ==
=== Democratic Republic of Georgia ===
The first State Security Service unit – Special Squad (Georgian: განსაკუთრებული რაზმი)- was introduced and approved on July 26, 1918 in the Democratic Republic of Georgia. Its tasks included fighting bolshevik uprisings, insurgents, counterfeiters, criminals and overall activities necessary for the security of the Democratic Republic of Georgia. The first head of the Special Squad was Melchizedek (Meki) Kedia.

=== Soviet era ===
After the Soviet Occupation of Georgia in 1921 a repressive institution was created instead. It was originally part of the Ministry of State Security of the Georgian SSR and was repeatedly reformed and merged with the Ministry of Internal Affairs over the course of several decades before both ministries ultimately merged in 2003. Before the Georgian declaration of independence from the Soviet Union in 1991, the Republic had its own republican intelligence agency on the basis of the Committee for State Security (KGB), which was notable in part because the Georgian KGB was considered by the party leadership to be the most effective of regional branches of the KGB. The Georgian KGB was under the notable 30 year rule of Aleksi Inauri and Givi Gumbaridze for most of its existence.

== History ==
Until 2015 the State Security Agency was an integral part of the MIA and its primary intelligence as well as counterintelligence component. In the fight against terrorism, however, Georgia lacked a uniform coordinated force as many law enforcement units and government agencies claimed counter terrorism as their area of responsibility, despite the fact a specialised and designated anti-terror unit had already existed for many years. In order to unify the efforts of all institutions, an interagency mechanism was established in 2014 that would operate as a joint task force subordinated to a crisis management council in the event of major terrorist attacks. Nonetheless, as a result of the rapidly increasing threat of international terrorism, the Georgian government decided to reinstate the State Security Service as a separate and independent agency and task it with priority counter terrorism related missions and activities. For this task the country's most elite counter terror unit has been transferred to the SSSG for all operative measures.

== Fields of activities ==
=== Counter terrorism ===
The fight against terrorism is one of the main priorities of the SSSG notably due to recent developments in the Middle East. Georgia has been participating in the war on terror from the beginning and has to some extent found itself increasingly becoming a transit country for combatants and potential Islamic terrorists as violence keeps continuously rising in the conflicted Arab nations. Even though the likelihood of a terrorist attack may be minimal to the country itself, such activities undermine and endanger the political and military efforts of allied and partner nations thus why Georgias efforts in those areas are essential to not only regional security. If direct operational and surgical means are required to effectively deter and combat terrorist threats the agency deploys two special units – one of which is part of the Special Operations Division and operates primarily on domestic level to contain individuals or entire cells that conduct radical activities which endanger national security. The Counterterrorism Center is the primary division dominantly engaged in anti-terror warfare and fields the country's most experienced and designated force in that area.

In accordance to their tasks and activities the members of its tactical intervention force regularly train and retrain on all forms of combat particularly in connection with counter terrorism including among other, special sniper courses, alpine warfare, special CQB training, the search and destruction of terrorist camps, specialization on explosive devices, their defusal and deploying means to prevent and counteract the use of weapons of mass destruction. The center operates in conjunction with the nations own and foreign intelligence services including Interpol. Each of its operator undergoes foreign courses in cooperation with a number of partner nations to constantly enhance their capabilities. Material and equipment as well as infrastructural needs have been steadily upgraded over the years.

The unit is also the first to engage in high risk domestic or international operations, former starting in the mid-to late 1990s and latter from 2001 on losing an undisclosed number of servicemen. Georgia is an active member and advisor of the global anti-terrorist coalition and constantly participates in multinational operations.

=== Prevention and proliferation of CBRN threats ===
Georgia is the regional center for biological-and virological research and also hosts a number of soviet military- and research facilities as well as storage areas that contain radioactive and chemical substances. Those facilities are subjected to a permanent state of control and monitoring by the SSSG. However, on the occupied territories international security measures have not been implemented thus maintaining transit routes and much greater vulnerability to smuggling of CBRN material through the country than already present.

Such weaknesses have been exploited on multiple occasions throughout the years. Many attempts were made to smuggle depleted and enriched uranium in or out of the country, however most of those have been prevented by investigative and operative events. In the more recent period alone over 19 individuals have been detained on charges of illicit trafficking of nuclear material in four incidents.

Georgia works closely with the US, UN, partner nations and the CBRN CoE and was the first nation to elaborate and adopt the Strategy and Action Plan of the EU thus becoming one of the primary members of the 28 nations initiative. One of the SSSGs priorities is to also become member of the G7 Global Partnership Against the Spread of Weapons and Materials of Mass Destruction.

== International Cooperation ==
A cooperation deal between the SSG and the State Security Committee of Belarus (KGB) was signed in 2016 and came into force in 2021. At the time it came into force, their relationship was criticized over the KGB's role in suppressing the 2020–2021 Belarusian protests.

== Structure ==
The SSSG consists of following structural entities:

- Administration
- Counterterrorism Center
- Anti-Corruption Agency
- Counterintelligence Division
- State Security Division
- Information-Analytical Division
- Operative-Technical Division
- Division for Operative Measures
- Economic Division
- Special Operations Department
- Facilities Protection Division
- Main Division Human Resources
- General Inspection
