= Centre of Excellence on Public Security =

Brazil-based think tank

The Centre of Excellence on Public Security (CEPS) is a think tank based in Rio de Janeiro in Brazil which studies aspects of public security, advocating multi-dimensional responses to Public Security issues. The CEPS works to bring together policy makers, operational law enforcement officers and independent experts, for dialogues towards generating innovative solutions to complex Public Security issues. The CEPS is overseen by a Scientific Advisory Board, whose chairman is Raymond Kendall, Honorary Secretary General of Interpol.

The CEPS has organised international dialogues on Public Security in Brazil and Africa, and coordinates dialogue on combating drug trafficking with Civil Police departments in the South Cone area on Brazil. CEPS is an initiative of The International Council on Security and Development (ICOS), a Security and Development Policy Group established by The Network of European Foundations.

The Global Media Centre directs their media outreach.

== The Centre of Excellence on Public Security ==
The Centre of Excellence on Public Security was established by The International Council on Security and Development (ICOS) in 2008 to bridge the gap between the perspectives of policymakers and practitioners with on-the-ground experience. The Centre facilitates dialogue and innovation on public security between key actors, encouraging a multi-sector approach that incorporates development and social policy with law enforcement strategies. The Centre offers research and consultancy services and works with governments to construct public security policies for the 21st century.

== Public Security Scientific Board ==
The activities of the Centre of Excellence are overseen by an international Scientific Board of leading experts and practitioners from law enforcement, academic and managerial backgrounds. The Board is chaired by Raymond Kendall, the Former Secretary General of Interpol.

== Projects to date ==
First International Symposium on Public Security and Drug Policy, Rio de Janeiro: Held in February 2008 in conjunction with the Brazilian National Public Security and National Antidrug Secretariats and the Federal Police Department, the Symposium brought together policy-makers, police officers, and drug policy specialists from around the world for a pragmatic reflection on drug policy design.

Pact of Parana, Curitiba: Bringing together the heads of narcotics departments from the six southern-cone states of Brazil, the First Pact, in May 2007, established commitments of interstate communication and cooperation, and quarterly meetings to deepen understanding of the multidimensional nature of narcotics challenges in the region.

Africa – Brazil Public Security Dialogue, Entebbe: Bringing together African and Brazilian public security policymakers and operators in July 2008, the event enabled a unique South-South exchange of experiences, and generated new ideas on the provision of public security in the face of 21st century challenges.

== See also ==
- United Nations Office on Drugs and Crime
