= Rome Consensus for a Humanitarian Drug Policy =

The Rome Consensus for a Humanitarian Drug Policy is a framework for dialogue and cooperation that commits 114 National Societies of Red Cross and Red Crescent from Africa, Asia, the Americas and Europe to promote and implement humanitarian approaches to drug policy. The Rome Consensus aims at raising the profile of drug policy to the forefront of social concerns, hinging formulation and implementation of drug control on public health concerns.

The foundation text of the Rome Consensus reinforces the Red Cross - Red Crescent movement's engagement in drug policy. In a nutshell, within the Rome Consensus Declaration National Societies:

- Recognize the need for a new humanitarian, realistic, public health and socially based drug policy;
- Establish a new commitment to a humanitarian drug policy based on reason and compassion that generates action, free from ideology, force, stigmatization and discrimination;
- Commit the strength of the Red Cross - Red Crescent Movement provided by its auxiliary role to national governments on humanitarian assistance, to actively encourage the formulation and implementation of a humanitarian drug policy that saves lives and alleviates human suffering.

The Global Media Centre handles their media outreach.

== Chairs of the Rome Consensus ==
The International Council on Security and Development (ICOS) co-chairs the Rome Consensus for a Humanitarian Drug Policy together with the Italian Red Cross.

== Recent events ==
=== Drug Prevention, Treatment and Harm Reduction: Scaling-up of Red Cross-Red Crescent Best Practices, Rome, 14–15 December 2009 ===
As announced during the Rome Consensus Europe Conference in March this year, the Rome Consensus for a Humanitarian Drug Policy has entered its second phase, focusing on training, concrete information exchange and scaling-up of best practices through the entire network of the Red Cross in Europe. To mark this important next phase, a first two-day Seminar entitled Drug Prevention, Treatment and Harm Reduction: Scaling-up of Red Cross-Red Crescent Best Practices was held in Rome on 14 and 15 December 2009. Supported by the European Commission and the International Council on Security and Development (ICOS), this Seminar brought together practitioners from all European National Societies to tackle three concrete drug policy interventions in the fields of prevention, treatment and harm reduction and discuss how these best practices could be implemented throughout the wider network of the Red Cross-Red Crescent.

=== Rome Consensus Activities at Solferino 2009 ===
On the occasion of the 150th anniversary of the foundation of the Red Cross – Red Crescent Movement, the Rome Consensus participated to the activities of Solferino 2009. The Consensus coordination hosted a workshop on youth and drugs on the 25th of June and a round table on a Red Cross and Red Crescent Humanitarian Response to stigma and discrimination linked to drug use, on the 27 of June. The Rome Consensus and its European initiative Rome Consensus Europe were presented as effective means to promote and implement humanitarian approaches to drug policy in the Red Cross movement - Red Crescent Movement and especially among the youth.

=== Rome Consensus Europe Conference Rising to the Challenge of Drug Use in Europe, Madrid - 26 and 27 March 2009 ===
The Rome Consensus Europe Conference, Rising to the Challenge of Drug Use in Europe brought together National Societies of Red Cross and Red Crescent in Europe, European Union (EU) institution representatives and other leading practitioners to exchange best practices in prevention, treatment and care, and explore concrete ways for National Societies to contribute to drug policy responses in Europe.

=== Rome Consensus Regional Meeting for Eastern and Southern Africa – Entebbe, Uganda, 4–5 July 2008 ===
The Rome Consensus Regional Meeting for Eastern and Southern Africa gathered Presidents and Secretaries General from Red Cross National Societies from the region to discuss the drug policy situation in Southern and Eastern Africa and the Red Cross – Red Crescent engagement in Humanitarian Drug Policy.

=== Red Cross – Red Crescent World Congress on Humanitarian Drug Policy – Barcelona, Spain, 5–7 March 2008 ===
The Red Cross- Red Crescent World Congress on Humanitarian Drug Policy was hosted by the Spanish Red Cross with the Support of The International Council on Security and Development (ICOS) in Barcelona on 5–7 March 2008. The Congress, with the participation of over sixty National Societies of Red Cross and Red Crescent, aimed at engaging the whole RC/RC movement in the formulation and implementation of humanitarian approaches to global drug policy.

=== Rome Consensus First African Regional Meeting – Praia, Cape Verde, 13–16 December 2007 ===
Seventeen National Societies of Red Cross and Red Crescent from Western Africa met in Cape Verde to discuss the opportunity the Rome Consensus represents to National Societies in the region to mobilize on drug policy issues. The meeting was hosted by the Cape Verde Red Cross and was supported by The International Council on Security and Development (ICOS).

=== Rome Consensus Regional Meeting for the Caribbean and Central America – St. George's, Grenada, 6–9 December 2007 ===
The Rome Consensus Regional Meeting for the Caribbean and Central America, hosted in St Georges, Grenada by the Grenada Red Cross and The International Council on Security and Development (ICOS) presented the Rome Consensus for a Humanitarian Drug policy as a key framework to engage Red Cross societies in the Caribbean and in Central America in humanitarian solutions for regional drug challenges.

=== The Rome Consensus Regional Meeting for Asia and the Pacific - Manila, Philippines, 27–29 September 2007 ===
The meeting was hosted by The Philippine National Red Cross Society in partnership with The International Council on Security and Development (ICOS). The Meeting raised awareness on drug policy concerns, teasing out the main issues regarding substance abuse in Asia and the Pacific, opened a fruitful debate on drug policy.

== List of Signatories ==
The following Red Cross/ Red Crescent National Societies are signatories of the Rome Consensus for a Humanitarian Drug Policy:

=== Europe ===
- Albania
- Armenia
- Azerbaijan
- Belarus
- Bosnia and Herzegovina
- Bulgaria
- Croatia
- Estonia
- Georgia
- Italy
- Kazakhstan
- Kyrgyzstan
- Latvia
- Lithuania
- Malta
- Montenegro
- Portugal
- Romania
- Russia
- San Marino
- Serbia
- Slovakia
- Slovenia
- Spain
- Tajikistan
- Turkey
- Turkmenistan
- Ukraine
- Uzbekistan

=== Middle East ===
- Egypt
- Iraq
- Iran
- Lebanon
- Libya
- Palestine
- Syria
- Tunisia
- United Arab Emirates
- Yemen

=== Americas ===
- Antigua and Barbuda
- Argentina
- Bahamas
- Barbados
- Belize
- Bolivia
- Brazil
- Chile
- Colombia
- Costa Rica
- Cuba
- Dominica
- Dominican Republic
- Ecuador
- El Salvador
- Grenada
- Guatemala
- Guyana
- Honduras
- Jamaica
- Mexico
- Nicaragua
- Panama
- Paraguay
- Peru
- Saint Lucia
- Saint Vincent and the Grenadines
- Trinidad and Tobago
- Uruguay
- Venezuela

=== Africa ===
- Benin
- Botswana
- Burkina Faso
- Cape Verde
- Côte d'Ivoire
- Ethiopia
- Gambia
- Guinea-Bissau
- Guinea
- Kenya
- Mali
- Mauritania
- Mozambique
- Niger
- Rwanda
- Sao Tome and Principe
- Senegal
- South Africa
- Swaziland
- Tanzania
- Togo
- Zambia
- Uganda

=== Asia - Pacific ===
- Afghanistan
- Australia
- Bangladesh
- China
- Cook Islands
- Fiji
- Malaysia
- Federated States of Micronesia
- Nepal
- Pakistan
- Philippines
- Papua New Guinea
- Samoa
- Sri Lanka
- Solomon Islands
- Thailand
- Timor Leste
- Tonga
- Tuvalu
- Vanuatu
- Vietnam

=== IFDC Bodies ===
- Youth Commission
- Development Commission
- Health Commission
- Mediterranean Centre Commission

== See also ==
- United Nations Office on Drugs and Crime (UNODC)
- World Health Organization (WHO)
