= Ana Domingos =

Portuguese neuroscientist

Professor Ana Domingos
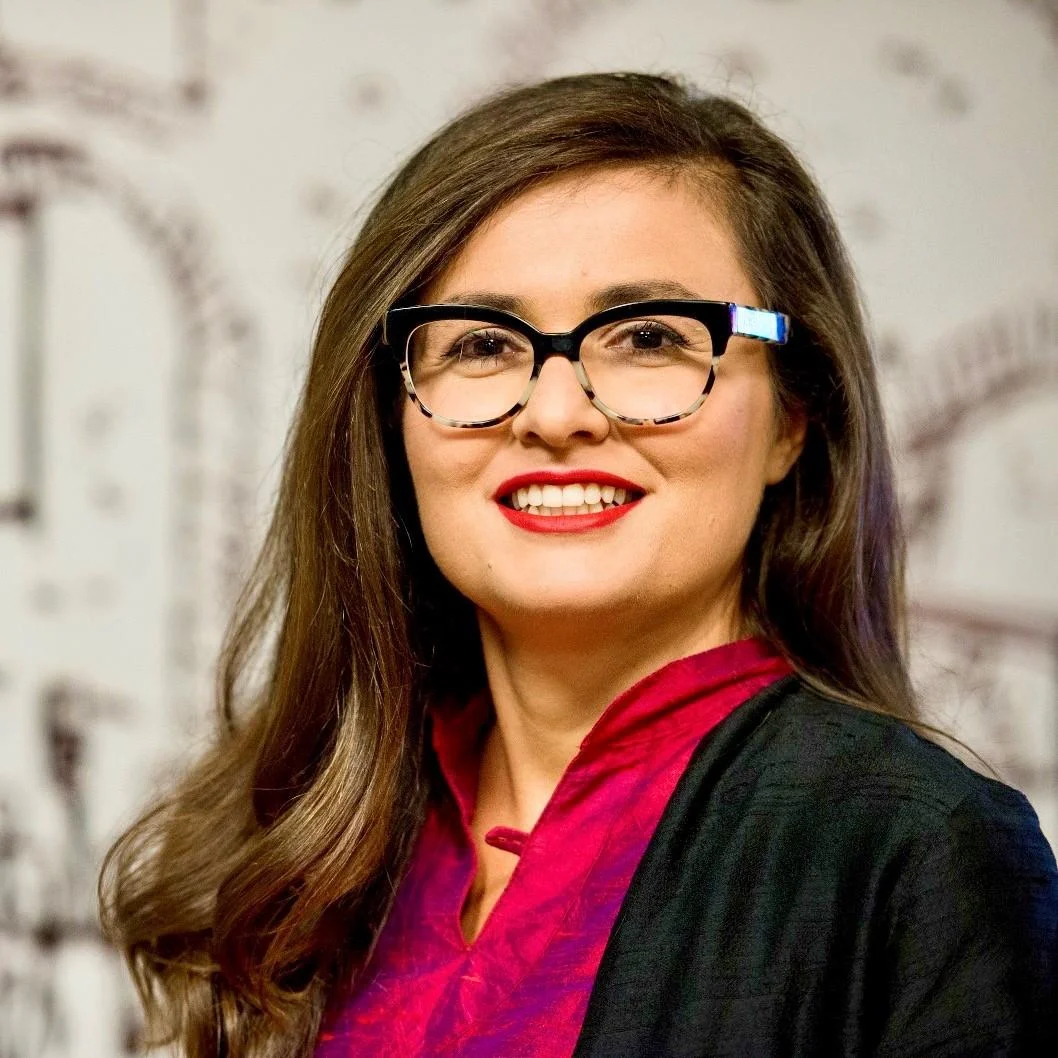
- Domingos’ headshot from DPAG staff listings
- Born: Ana Domingos; Portugal
- Education: University of Lisbon; Rockefeller University
- Occupations: Neuroscientist, physiologist
- Years active: 2000–present
- Known for: Studies on obesity
- Website: https://www.dpag.ox.ac.uk/team/ana-domingos https://www.dpag.ox.ac.uk/research/domingos

Ana I. Domingos is a Portuguese neuroscientist specialising in the treatment of obesity independently of food intake. Domingos is a full Professor of Neuroscience at the Department of Physiology, Anatomy and Genetics of the University of Oxford in the United Kingdom. Domingos is also a fellow, tutor and the director of studies in medicine at Lady Margaret Hall, Oxford.

A trained mathematician, Domingos began her research career by pursuing a Ph.D. in neurobiology at Rockefeller University. Supervised by Leslie Voshall, Domingos studied the sensory systems facilitating our sense of smell. As a post-doctoral research scientist, Domingos worked under Jeffrey Friedman, investigating how one's metabolism can influence the brain circuitry involved in sweetener cravings.

Domingos founded her own laboratory in the Gulbenkian Institute in Portugal where she made a number of key discoveries. Firstly, her laboratory discovered that a hormone produced by fat, called leptin, interacts with the sympathetic nerves to control fat breakdown. Sympathetic nerves release a hormone called noradrenaline which is received by a molecular switch expressed by fat tissue, called a β-2 receptor. Activation of the β-2 receptor or "switch" causes the fat tissue to "burn off" as heat. Secondly, her laboratory was able to visualize how sympathetic neurons connect with fat tissue. Thirdly, the Domingos laboratory studied how "Pac-Man-like" immune cells close to sympathetic neurons, dubbed sympathetic associated macrophages, could contribute to obesity by absorbing the noradrenergic chemical signals sent by the sympathetic neurons to fat tissue.

Sympathomimetic drugs behave like the chemical signals produced by sympathetic neurons interacting with fat. Collaborating with scientists in The University of Cambridge, the Domingos' lab in Oxford hopes to improve upon sympathomimetics, by producing a class of compounds that do not interact with the central nervous or cardiovascular systems, thereby limiting side effects. These new and improved compounds are dubbed sympathofacilitators. To this end, the Domingos' group studies the circuit properties of sympathetic neural networks interact with fat and how they are regulated by immune cells, pioneering a new field of research coined Neuroimmunometabolism on which her lab has authored reviews.

== Education ==
Between 1995 and 1999, Domingos studied mathematics up to MSc level at the University of Lisbon and in Paris. She then studied for a PhD in olfactory neuroscience at the Rockefeller University in New York City, supervised by Leslie B. Vosshall where she authored papers in Neuron and Current Biology.

== Career and Research ==
Between 2006 and 2013, Domingos did post-doctoral work with Jeffrey M. Friedman at the Rockefeller University. Domingos studied how metabolic signals affect neural circuitry underlying sweetener choices while in the Friedman lab, publishing several works.

She then returned to Portugal to work at the Obesity Laboratory of the Instituto Gulbenkian de Ciência in Oeiras near the Portuguese capital, Lisbon. While at Gulbenkian, the Domingos laboratory discovered that the sympathetic neuro-adipose axis mediates the liolytic effect of leptin. This discovery culminated in a seminal work, published in Cell in 2015. Following on from this discovery, the Domingos laboratory, provided the first visualization of adipose sympathetic neurons and demonstrated its necessity for fat mass reduction via norepinephrine signaling. Therefore, the Domingos group in Portugal characterized the peripheral efferent arm in the neuroendocrine loop of afferent leptin action in the brain. In Gulbenkian, Domingo's also discovered sympathetic neuron-associated macrophages (SAMs) contribute to obesity by importing and metabolizing norepinephrine.

In 2018, Domingos moved to Oxford in the UK to work at the Department of Physiology, Anatomy and Genetics (DPAG) of the University of Oxford as an associate professor in neuroscience. In 2022, Domingos advanced to the position of (full) Professor of Neuroscience where she heads a laboratory bearing her name. Her laboratory in Oxford, in a collaborative effort with the University of Cambridge, has developed a new class of anti-obesity compounds that could potentially avoid the harmful side effects of traditional treatments. Domingos aims to shift the treatment paradigm of obesity, through the development of a new class of anti-obesity drugs dubbed sympathofacilitators. Sympathofacilitators act as an energy sink by coupling thermogenesis to active heat dissipation. Sympathofacilitators improve upon sympathomimetic drugs by not interacting with the central nervous or cardiovascular systems, thereby limiting side effects.

Domingos also holds patents in the UK and US regarding pharmacological targeting of sympathetic associated macrophages to drive thermogenic activity.

== Awards & Funding ==
Domingos leads a research laboratory consisting of three postdoctoral research scientists, four graduate (DPhil) students and a research assistant. Members of the Domingos laboratory have secured funding from Wellcome Immunology, the British Heart Foundation, Shineroad, NovoNordisk and Croucher Foundation to fund their projects.

As of 2023, the Domingos group is currently funded by competitive research grants from the Wellcome Trust, European Research Council, and the Pfizer ASPIRE Obesity Award. Notable previous prestigious awards include;

- 2023: American Physiological Society, Karl Ludwig Distinguished Lecture
- 2020: Marie Curie Postdoctoral Fellowship to fund project in Domingos group
- 2018: Marie Curie Postdoctoral Fellowship to fund project in Domingos group
- 2016: Human Frontiers Science Program
- 2015: EMBO, Young Investigator Installation Award

== Media & Research Talks ==
Domingos promotes science communication. Listed below are a number of freely available research talks and media appearances.

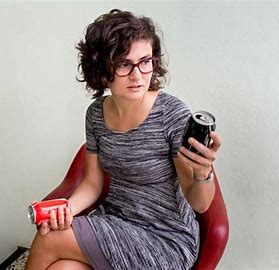
Ana Domingos media appearance in "Food for Thought" article on eLife. Photographer Roberto Kelleher

- "Neuroimmunometabolism" by Ana Domingos at Global Immunotalks
- "Neuroimmunometabolism" by Ana Domingos at Oxford University Scientific Society
- "Optogenetics for neuroimmunity" by Ana Domingos at Society for Neuroscience
- "Mouse brains eavesdrop on their fat" by Alejandra Manjarrez, The New Scientist ft. Ana Domingos
- "Food for Thought" Ana Domingos interview on eLife

== Publications ==
Domingos has published widely in peer-reviewed journals. The Domingos group is actively publishing, with two manuscripts under review as of May 2023. Domingos is the Editor-in-Chief of the American Physiological Societies Endocrinology and Metabolism Journal. Domingos is also a member of the advisory board of the journal, Cell Metabolism and eLife .

The following is a list of Domingos' groups most recent publications.

Preprints

1. Haberman, Emma Rose, et al. "Immunomodulatory Leptin Receptor Sympathetic Perineurial Cells Protect Against Obesity by Facilitating Neuroendocrine-Mediated Brown Adipose Tissue Thermogenesis." BioRxiv 2023.05.09.539963

Peer-reviewed publications

1. Yitao Zhu, Lu Yao, Ana L. Gallo-Ferraz, Bruna Bombassaro, Marcela R. Simões, Ichitaro Abe, Jing Chen, Gitalee Sarker, Alessandro Ciccarelli, Linna Zhou, Carl Lee, Davi Sidarta-Oliveira, Noelia Martínez-Sánchez, Michael L. Dustin, Cheng Zhan, Tamas L. Horvath, Lício Velloso, Shingo Kajimura & Ana I. Domingos. Sympathetic neuropeptide Y protects from obesity by sustaining thermogenic fat. Nature 634, 243–250 (2024).
2. O'Brien, Conan JO, and Ana I. Domingos. "Old and "hangry" monocytes turn from friend to foe under assault." Immunity 56.4 (2023): 747-749.
3. Noelia Martinez-Sanchez, Owen Sweeney, Davi Sidarta-Oliveira, Alexandre Caron, Sarah A. Stanley, Ana I Domingos. The sympathetic nervous system in the 21st Century: neuro-immune interactions in metabolic homeostasis and obesity. Neuron 110(21), 3597-3626 (2022).
4. Filipa Cardoso, Roel G J Klein Wolterink, Cristina Godinho-Silva, Rita G Domingues, Hélder Ribeiro, Joaquim Alves da Silva, Inês Mahú, Ana I Domingos, Henrique Veiga-Fernandes. Neuro-mesenchymal units control ILC2 and Obesity via a brain–adipose circuit. Nature 597, 410–414 (2021).
5. O'Brien CJO & Domingos AI. An anti-obesity immunotherapy?. Science Vol 373, 6550 24-25 (2021).
6. O'Brien CJO, Haberman ER, Domingos AI. A Tale of Three Systems: Toward a Neuroimmunoendocrine Model of Obesity. Annual Rev Cell Dev Biol. 2021 October 6;37:549-573.
7. Inês Mahú, Andreia Barateiro, Eva Rial-Pensado, Noelia Martinéz-Sánchez, Sandra H Vaz, Pedro M S D Cal, Benjamin Jenkins, Tiago Rodrigues, Carlos Cordeiro, Miguel F Costa, Raquel Mendes, Elsa Seixas, Mafalda M A Pereira, Nadiya Kubasova, Vitka Gres, Imogen Morris, Carolina Temporão, Marta Olivares, Yolanda Sanz, Albert Koulman, Francisco Corzana, Ana M Sebastião, Miguel López, Gonçalo J L Bernardes, Ana I Domingos. Brain-sparing sympathofacilitators mitigate obesity without adverse cardiovascular effects. Cell Metabolism June 2;31(6):1120-1135 (2020).
8. Gitalee Sarker, Chelsea M Larabee, Ana I Domingos. ILC3s gut rhythm. Nature Immunology. 21, 106–108 (2020).
9. Emma R Haberman, Ana I Domingos. Illuminating Neuroimmunity: A Humoral Brain. Immunity 16;52(6):900-902 (2020).
10. Chelsea M Larabee, Oliver C Neely, Ana I Domingos. Obesity: a neuroimmunometabolic perspective. Nature Rev Endocrinol. Jan;16(1):30-43. (2020)
11. Ana I Domingos. Leptin: a missing piece in the immunometabolism puzzle. Nature Rev Immunology. 20, 3 (2020)
12. Julian Meyer Berger, Parminder Singh, Lori Khrimian, Donald A Morgan, Subrata Chowdhury, Emilio Arteaga-Solis, Tamas L Horvath, Ana I Domingos, Anna L Marsland, Vijay Kumar Yadav, Kamal Rahmouni, Xiao-Bing Gao, Gerard Karsenty. Mediation of the Acute Stress Response by the Skeleton. Cell Metab. 2019 Nov 5;30(5):890-902.e8
13. Patricia Seoane-Collazo, Laura Liñares-Pose, Eva Rial-Pensado, Amparo Romero-Picó, José María Moreno-Navarrete, Noelia Martínez-Sánchez, Pablo Garrido-Gil, Ramón Iglesias-Rey, Donald A Morgan, Naoki Tomasini, Samuel Andrew Malone, Ana Senra, Cintia Folgueira, Gema Medina-Gomez, Tomás Sobrino, José L Labandeira-García, Rubén Nogueiras, Ana I Domingos, José-Manuel Fernández-Real, Kamal Rahmouni, Carlos Diéguez, Miguel López. Central nicotine induces browning through hypothalamic κ opioid receptors. Nature Commun. 2019 Sep 6;10(1):4037.
14. Frank Zufall 1, Ana I Domingos. The structure of Orco and its impact on our understanding of olfaction.J Gen Physiol. 2018 Dec 3;150(12):1602-1605.
15. Roksana M Pirzgalska, Elsa Seixas, Jason S Seidman, Verena M Link, Noelia Martínez Sánchez, Inês Mahú, Raquel Mendes, Vitka Gres, Nadiya Kubasova, Imogen Morris, Bernardo A Arús, Chelsea M Larabee, Miguel Vasques, Francisco Tortosa, Ana L Sousa, Sathyavathy Anandan, Erin Tranfield, Maureen K Hahn, Matteo Iannacone, Nathanael J Spann, Christopher K Glass, Ana I Domingos. Sympathetic neuron-associated macrophages contribute to obesity by importing and metabolizing norepinephrine. Nature Medicine. 2017 Nov;23(11):1309-1318.
16. Mafalda M A Pereira, Inês Mahú, Elsa Seixas, Noelia Martinéz-Sánchez, Nadiya Kubasova, Roksana M Pirzgalska, Paul Cohen, Marcelo O Dietrich, Miguel López, Gonçalo J L Bernardes, Ana I Domingos. A brain-sparing diphtheria toxin for chemical genetic ablation of peripheral cell lineages. Nature Commun. 2017 Apr 3;8:14967.
17. Andreia Barateiro, Ines Mahú, Ana I Domingos. Leptin Resistance and the Neuro-Adipose Connection. Frontiers Endocrinol (Lausanne). 2017 Mar 6;8:45.
18. Teruyuki Sano, Wendy Huang, Jason A Hall, Yi Yang, Alessandra Chen, Samuel J Gavzy, June-Yong Lee, Joshua W Ziel, Emily R Miraldi, Ana I Domingos, Richard Bonneau, Dan R Littman. An IL-23R/IL-22 Circuit Regulates Epithelial Serum Amyloid A to Promote Local Effector Th17 Responses. Cell. 2016 January 14;164(1–2):324.
19. Nadiya Kubasova, Denis Burdakov, Ana I Domingos. Sweet and Low on Leptin: Hormonal Regulation of Sweet Taste Buds. Diabetes. 2015 Nov;64(11):3651-2.
20. Wenwen Zeng, Roksana M Pirzgalska, Mafalda M A Pereira, Nadiya Kubasova, Andreia Barateiro, Elsa Seixas, Yi-Hsueh Lu, Albina Kozlova, Henning Voss, Gabriel G Martins, Jeffrey M Friedman, Ana I Domingos. Sympathetic neuro-adipose connections mediate leptin-driven lipolysis. Cell. 2015 Sep 24;163(1):84-94.
21. Bernardo S Reis, Kihyun Lee, Melania H Fanok, Cristina Mascaraque, Manal Amoury, Lillian B Cohn, Aneta Rogoz, Olof S Dallner, Pedro M Moraes-Vieira, Ana I Domingos, Daniel Mucida. Leptin receptor signaling in T cells is required for Th17 differentiation. J Immunology. 2015 June 1;194(11):5253-60.
22. Nilay Yapici, Manuel Zimmer, Ana I Domingos. Cellular and molecular basis of decision-making. EMBO Rep. 2014
23. Ana I Domingos, Aylesse Sordillo, Marcelo O Dietrich, Zhong-Wu Liu, Luis A Tellez, Jake Vaynshteyn, Jozelia G Ferreira, Mats I Ekstrand, Tamas L Horvath, Ivan E de Araujo, Jeffrey M Friedman. Hypothalamic melanin concentrating hormone neurons communicate the nutrient value of sugar. Elife. 2013 Dec 31;2:e01462.
24. Ana I Domingos, Jake Vaynshteyn, Aylesse Sordillo, Jeffrey M Friedman. The reward value of sucrose in leptin-deficient obese mice. Mol Metab. 2013 Dec 5;3(1):73-80. doi: 10.1016/j.molmet.2013.10.007. eCollection 2014 Feb.
25. Sarah Stanley, Ana I Domingos, Leah Kelly, Alastair Garfield, Shadi Damanpour, Lora Heisler, Jeffrey Friedman. Profiling of Glucose-Sensing Neurons Reveals that GHRH Neurons Are Activated by Hypoglycemia. Cell Metab. 2013 Oct 1;18(4):596-607.
26. Ana I Domingos, Jake Vaynshteyn, Henning U Voss, Xueying Ren, Viviana Gradinaru, Feng Zang, Karl Deisseroth, Ivan E de Araujo, Jeffrey Friedman. Leptin regulates the reward value of nutrient. Nature Neurosci. 2011 Nov 13;14(12):1562-8.
27. Elane Fishilevich, Ana I Domingos, Kenta Asahina, Félix Naef, Leslie B Vosshall, Matthieu Louis. Chemotaxis behavior mediated by single larval olfactory neurons in Drosophila. Current Biol. 2005 Dec 6;15(23):2086-96.
28. Mattias C Larsson, Ana I Domingos, Walton D Jones, M Eugenia Chiappe, Hubert Amrein, Leslie B Vosshall. Or83b encodes a broadly expressed odorant receptor essential for Drosophila olfaction. Neuron. 2004 September 2;43(5):703-14.

A selection of her articles for which she has been the sole author or lead article follows.

1. Ana I Domingos, Leptin: a missing piece in the immunometabolism puzzle. Nature Rev Immunology. 20, 3 (2020)
2. AI Domingos, J Vaynshteyn, HU Voss, X Ren, V Gradinaru, F Zang, et al. Leptin regulates the reward value of nutrient. Nature neuroscience 14 (12), 1562–1568
3. AI Domingos, A Sordillo, MO Dietrich, ZW Liu, LA Tellez, J Vaynshteyn, et al. Hypothalamic melanin concentrating hormone neurons communicate the nutrient value of sugar. Elife 2, e01462
4. AI Domingos, J Vaynshteyn, A Sordillo, JM Friedman. The reward value of sucrose in leptin-deficient obese mice. Molecular metabolism 3 (1), 73-80 279
5. AI Domingos. Leptin: a missing piece in the immunometabolism puzzle. Nature Reviews Immunology 20 (1), 3-3
6. A Domingos. Lean on Leptin or Lean for Sugar. J Obes Wt Loss Ther 3 (166), 2
