= International Council on Security and Development =

- Abbreviation: ICOS
- Formation: 2002
- Type: International relations think tank
- Location(s): Brussels (administration); London, United Kingdom; Medellín, Colombia; Rio de Janeiro, Brazil; Tunis, Tunisia; Amman, Jordan; Sharjah, United Arab Emirates; Kabul, Kandahar, Lashkargah, Afghanistan
- President and founder: Norine MacDonald
- Website: www.icosgroup.net

The International Council on Security and Development (ICOS) is an international think tank that focuses on Afghanistan and other conflict zones all over the world such as Iraq, Syria and Somalia. ICOS is a project of the Network of European Foundations' The Mercator Fund. The organization was originally named the Senlis Council in 2002 but later in 2013 renamed as the International Council on Security and Development to reflect the interest and activities of the organization.

The organization works on security and development issues and states that its objective is "to promote open debate to alleviate current governance, development and economic crises and ensure policymaking in these areas is informed, humanitarian and delivers impact."

The organization currently runs five programs: Human Security and Youth Inclusion, Education and Employment, Public Safety and Citizenship, Global Food Security and The Rome Consensus for a Humanitarian Drug Policy.

== ICOS programs ==
The program on Human Security and Youth Inclusion focuses on contemporary conflict zones, including Afghanistan, Iraq, Syria and Somalia. Reports have noted the problem of unemployment leading to "Angry Young Men" becoming involved in insurgency actions. The 2010 field research in Afghanistan showed how Afghans were unaware of 11 September attacks, and the negative views held by Afghan citizens against the foreign forces. Reports have drawn controversy, with NATO spokesmen disputing an ICOS report's findings on the extent of the Taliban presence in Afghanistan. The findings on the ineffectiveness of Canadian development aid in Kandahar were also disputed by CIDA officials, regarding food aid and hospitals.

The Public Safety and Citizenship initiative "identifies global challenges for public safety in the 21st century". ICOS supports social and economic development, using a "Policy Labs" tool of participatory decision-making. It has conducted a pilot project in Asunción, Paraguay, addressing the problem of crack consumption and trafficking, and it has also worked in Farmiga, a community in the Tijuca neighborhood of Rio de Janeiro, on improving public safety in cooperation with the local Pacifying Police Unit.

The program on Global Food Security, in collaboration with the Sir Ratan Tata Trust and CINI, examines the intersection between food security, development, and state security. It currently focuses on India and Brazil, while maintaining a central aggregation website for information on food security.

== Directors and spokesmen ==
Norine MacDonald QC is Founder and President of ICOS.

Emmanuel Reinert is executive director and works out of the Rio de Janeiro office.

== Poppy licensing ==
One of the major policy recommendations is the licensing of opium in Afghanistan for pharmaceutical purposes. They argue that it is based on the premise that there are two problems that need to be solved:

1. Afghanistan's reliance on opium.
2. A lack of opiate-based medicines available for pharmaceutical purposes

They contend that this would be a short-to-medium-term solution to address the opium crisis that is occurring in Afghanistan since alternative livelihood programs in the country will take many years to come to fruition and no crop matches the agronomic properties of opium. Meanwhile, according to the World Health Organization there are unmet needs for morphine in developed countries and this is an even greater problem in developing countries, compounded by the growing rates of HIV/AIDS and cancer around the world.

Nobel Prize in Chemistry Laureate John Charles Polanyi and Stéphane Dion, leader of the Liberal Party of Canada, have expressed their support for the poppy for medicines project.

== Food aid in Afghanistan ==
The organization has carried out some food aid activities in informal internal refugee camps in the provinces of Kandahar and Helmand in southern Afghanistan.
