= Norine MacDonald =

American entrepreneur

Norine A. MacDonald KC
- Education: University of British Columbia (BA, LLB), INSEAD (Advanced Management Program), MIT Sloan School of Management (Artificial Intelligence: Implications for Business Strategy)
- Occupations: Lawyer, researcher, policy advocate, philanthropist
- Known for: President and Founder of RAIN Defense AI, Founder of The International Council on Security and Development
- Notable work: Killing Me Softly: Competition in Artificial Intelligence and Unmanned Aerial Vehicles (2020), Global Philanthropy, Philanthropy in Europe: A Rich Past, A Promising Future
- Awards: First Class Medal of Merit (Italian Red Cross, 2007), U.S. Department of the Army Decoration for Distinguished Civilian Service (2018), Distinguished Public Service Medal (2018)
- Website: RAIN Defense AI

Norine A. MacDonald KC is the President and Founder of RAINCLOUD, a global business and knowledge hub for the Defense + AI ecosystem.

== Early life and education ==
Ms MacDonald is former Visiting Distinguished Fellow at National Defense University. In 2020, MacDonald authored 'Killing Me Softly: Competition in Artificial Intelligence and Unmanned Aerial Vehicles' with George Howell.

She graduated from Massachusetts Institute of Technology Sloan School of Management in Artificial Intelligence: Implications for Business Strategy in September 2020.

== Career ==
=== Founding and Leadership Roles ===
She was formerly president and founder of The International Council on Security and Development (ICOS), an international security and development think tank founded in 2002 with offices in Kabul, London, Rio de Janeiro, Brussels and Paris, and field offices in the Afghan cities of Lashkar Gah and Kandahar City.

With ICOS, MacDonald promoted innovation in the security and development sectors. She started what became a global organization aimed at driving change by building strategic coalitions, bringing together influential stakeholders and investors around innovative solutions and pilot projects to test them.

=== Media and publications ===
MacDonald has appeared on CNN several times to discuss the situation in Afghanistan. In July 2008, she made a further appearance on CNN to talk about ICOS's report Iraq: 'Angry Hearts and Angry Minds'. She also co-edited two books: Global Philanthropy and Philanthropy in Europe: A Rich Past, A Promising Future.

=== Research in Afghanistan ===
Since 2005, MacDonald has led an extensive programme in Afghanistan focusing on global security development. Through field research, ICOS investigated the relationship between counter-narcotics, military, and development policies and their consequences on Afghanistan's reconstruction efforts. The Council's reports and video footage provide insight into the deteriorating development and security situations on the ground, especially in southern Afghanistan, and make policy recommendations to a broad audience of senior policy-makers and experts in NATO countries.

=== Philanthropy and advisory roles ===
As President of The Gabriel Foundation, MacDonald was a member of the Network of European Foundations for Innovative Cooperation(NEF). This is a platform which brings together twelve of the leading philanthropic organisations in Europe.

MacDonald was also a member of the International Advisory Council of the International Crisis Group(ICG).

== Honors and awards ==
In February 2007, she was awarded the First Class Medal of Merit of the Italian Red Cross for outstanding contributions to international humanitarian cooperation.

In 2018, MacDonald was awarded the U.S. Department of the Army Decoration for Distinguished Civilian Service and also in 2018, she received the Distinguished Public Service Medal for exceptional service to the United States Army.

== Other activities and recognition ==
MacDonald has international experience in law, academic research, policy, advocacy and philanthropy. She has testified before the Standing Committee on Foreign Affairs and International Development and Standing Committee on National Defence in Canada, and the House of Commons' Defence Committee in the United Kingdom. In October 2009, she testified before the US Senate Caucus on International Narcotics Control during a hearing on 'U.S. Counternarcotics Strategy in Afghanistan'.

MacDonald's work has been featured in a long list of publications including the Sunday Times, The Globe and Mail, The New York Times, The Washington Post and the Daily Telegraph, while she has also appeared on CNN, BBC, CBC, CTV and Al Jazeera International. She reports in her biography that she is a member of the Frontline Club.

Before founding ICOS, MacDonald was a partner in the law firm Bull, Housser and Tupper, specialising in commercial litigation, charities and tax law. Moreover, MacDonald held several prominent offices as a Bencher of the Law Society of British Columbia.

MacDonald holds a BA and an LLB from the University of British Columbia, and completed the Advanced Management Program at INSEAD in France in 2005. She was appointed Queen's Counsel in 1997.
