= Foundation for the Development of Caribbean Children =

- Formation: 2011
- Legal status: Foundation
- Purpose: Early Childhood Development in the Caribbean
- Location: Barbados
- Website: www.fdcchildren.org
- Formerly called: Caribbean Child Support Initiative (CCSI)

The Foundation for the Development of Caribbean Children (FDCC) is a nonprofit organisation helps disadvantaged young children in the Caribbean to reach their full potential through early childhood development (ECD) outreach. Headquartered in Bridgetown, Barbados and serving the entire Caribbean, the FDCC is the region's first indigenous foundation working in the ECD field. To improve the care environment for the region's youngest children, the FDCC prioritises access to good-quality ECD services (particularly for the socially vulnerable) and seeks to improve children's readiness (skills and knowledge) to enter primary school. The FDCC creates, controls and manages projects in several Caribbean nations. It also distributes resources as required. By targeting socially disadvantaged young children (birth to five years), the FDCC is different from other organisations working in the Caribbean ECD sector. Typically, other organisations and governments support mainstream, older children (once they have entered formal education structures).

== History ==
=== Context ===
Many young children fail to experience any structured early childhood programming in the Caribbean. Just 17% to 41% of children aged from birth to three years are likely to participate; this rises to between 65% and 100% for the three- to five-year-old age group (primary school entry).

=== Evolution ===
From 2002, an organisation funded by the Bernard van Leer Foundation and overseen by the Caribbean Centre for Development Administration (CARICAD) reviewed (a) parenting practices and (b) education in seven Caribbean countries with the aim of identifying replicable development models. The approach was regional and evolving; the intention was to share common methods between different Caribbean countries. This organisation was the Caribbean Support Initiative (CSI) which, in 2006, evolved into the Caribbean Child Support Initiative (CCSI) and, in 2011, evolved into the Foundation for the Development of Caribbean Children (FDCC). From 2002 to present, the CSI, CCSI and FDCC have sought to influence early childhood development (ECD) policies and programming, strengthen the Caribbean care environment, and respond to gaps in the ECD sector. The FDCC builds on the work of the CSI and CCSI. By early 2011, CCSI-supported ECD programmes benefitted over 10,000 children (aged from birth to three years) and consulted with over 3,000 parents. These programmes also enabled more than 200 young adults to receive 1,500 hours of ECD training (a new route to higher education). In one year alone, 50 Roving Caregivers achieved certification in NCTVET Level 1.

=== Establishment ===
When Bernard van Leer Foundation funding ended in 2011 (as scheduled), a real need remained for these initiatives. The FDCC was therefore established.

=== Operational history ===
Following its launch on June 27, 2011, the FDCC became operational in January 2012.

== Current projects ==
=== Approach ===
The FDCC believes ECD interventions must be sustainable, and this requires indigenous innovation. This, in turn, necessitates civic engagement (every level of the ECD sector must fully participate) in order to secure full recipient ownership (local ownership of programmes). The FDCC approach is therefore to help strengthen the ECD sector (its existing systems and services). No other Caribbean organisation takes the same approach. The FDCC offers three interrelated types of service:

- Family and community intervention
- Knowledge building and application
- Advocacy and communications for development

=== Roving Caregivers Programme (RCP) ===
The RCP is an informal home-visit ECD programme which reaches the youngest children (aged from birth to three years) who lack access to formal ECD services.

=== Early Childhood Health Outreach (ECHO) ===
The ECHO programme integrates the RCP with maternal and child health services. It targets socially vulnerable children (aged 0–5 years), their mothers and pregnant women. It was developed with UNICEF, PAHO and the St Vincent and the Grenadines Ministry of Health & Environment.

=== Family Learning Programme (FLP) ===
The FLP offers a model for family literacy and family learning. It offers teaching and learning materials, a training programme and a practitioner toolkit.

=== Youth and Community Advocacy Network (YouCAN) ===
Launched in 2010, YouCAN is a volunteer network of young people who seek community-level support for good-quality ECD and family support services.

=== Technical Programming Management Support ===
To support culturally relevant ECD solutions for the Caribbean, raise quality standards, and build indigenous ECD capacity, the FDCC provides:

- Technical advice on ECD, social development and health issues
- ECD policy and programming support (design, implementation and evaluation)
- Technical programming management support in project management, research, community and policy advocacy, communications for development, monitoring and evaluation, training and follow-up
