= EU CBRN Risk Mitigation CoE Initiative =

- Website: www.cbrn-coe.eu

The EU Centres of Excellence on Chemical, Biological, Radiological and Nuclear Risk Mitigation (CBRN CoE) is an initiative of the European Union which was launched in 2010. The initiative addresses the mitigation of and preparedness for risks related to CBRN material and agents. The origin of these risks can be criminal (proliferation, theft, sabotage and illicit trafficking), accidental (industrial catastrophes, in particular chemical or nuclear, waste treatment and transport) or natural (mainly pandemics but also be the consequence of natural hazards on CBRN material and facilities). The CBRN CoE Initiative seeks to boost cooperation at national, regional and international levels, and to develop a common and coherent CBRN risk mitigation policy at national and regional level. Risk mitigation comprises prevention, preparedness and post-crisis management.

== Objectives ==
Lack of coordination and preparedness related to CBRN risks at national level and fragmentation of responsibilities within a region can have dramatic consequences. This is why the European Union is setting up a framework for cooperation and coordination amongst all levels of government and international partners. This initiative is mirroring the EU CBRN Action Plan implemented inside the EU. The main objective of the EU CBRN CoE Initiative is to facilitate regional cooperation in order to enhance CBRN capabilities.

== Implementers ==
The initiative is implemented and funded by the European Commission (Directorate General for International Cooperation and Development - EuropeAid (DG DEVCO) in cooperation with the United Nations Interregional Crime and Justice Research Institute (UNICRI). The European External Action Service (EEAS) is also deeply involved in the follow-up of the initiative.

The initiative is developed with the technical support of the Joint Research Centre (JRC)) and relevant International/Regional Organisations, the EU Member States and other stakeholders, through coherent and effective cooperation at national, regional and international level.

== Legal Framework ==
The legal basis for the initiative is the Instrument for Stability (IfS) (Regulation (EC) No 1717/2006 of the European Parliament and of the Council of 15 November 2006 establishing an Instrument for Stability, OJ L 327/1 24.11.2006). Funding for the CoE comes from the long term component of the Instrument contributing to Stability and Peace (IcSP) that has as one of its aims, amongst many, to mitigate and prepare against risks. The CoE remit, specifically, is to mitigate CBRN risks whether of an intentional, accidental or natural origin.

== Cooperation with International and Regional Organisations ==
Where appropriate, the CBRN CoE Initiative is working in cooperation with international and regional partners or programmes, such as the IAEA, the OPCW, UNODA, BWC-ISU, the WHO, OIE, FAO, INTERPOL, EUROPOL, the UN SC 1540 Committee, the Arab League, the African Union, ASEAN, ISTC, Global Partnership Against the Spread of Weapons and Materials of Mass Destruction; each contributing with its own unique support according to its mandate.

== Regions ==
Growth of the CBRN CoE by year

The Centres of Excellence Initiative is present in 60 countries, and is grouped around eight Regional Secretariats:

- African Atlantic Façade (Benin, Cameroon, Côte d'Ivoire, Gabon, Liberia, Mauritania, Morocco, Senegal, Sierra Leone, Togo)
- Central Asia (Afghanistan, Kyrgyzstan, Mongolia, Pakistan, Tajikistan, Uzbekistan)
- Eastern and Central Africa (Burundi, DR Congo, Ethiopia, Ghana, Kenya, Malawi, Rwanda, Seychelles, Tanzania, Uganda, Zambia)
- Gulf Cooperation Council Countries (Kuwait, Qatar, Saudi Arabia, UAE)
- Middle East (Iraq, Jordan, Lebanon)
- North Africa and Sahel (Algeria, Burkina Faso, Libya, Mali, Morocco, Niger, Tunisia)
- South East Asia (Brunei Darussalam, Cambodia, Indonesia, Muang Lao, Malaysia, Myanmar, Philippines, Singapore, Thailand, Viet Nam)
- South East and Eastern Europe (Albania, Armenia, Azerbaijan, Bosnia and Herzegovina, North Macedonia, Georgia, Moldova, Montenegro, Serbia, Ukraine)

== Projects ==
Once Partner Country needs have been identified, by the implementation of the needs assessment process, regional projects are developed that are carried out to build capacity in the country and complement national measures. There are currently 66 projects underway involving CBRN experts from the Partner Countries together with experts from European Union Member States.

== See also ==
- Instrument for Stability
- CBRN defense
- European Union
- EuropeAid Development and Cooperation
- Joint Research Centre
- United Nations Interregional Crime and Justice Research Institute
- International Atomic Energy Agency
- Organisation for the Prohibition of Chemical Weapons
