= Gulbenkian Commission =

The Gulbenkian Commission sought to address inadequacies in the organization of the social science disciplines that developed in the nineteenth century by indicating a direction for social scientific inquiry for the next 50 years. It was founded by the Calouste Gulbenkian Foundation. It held three meetings in 1994 and 1995.

== Members ==
Its members included Immanuel Wallerstein (chair), Calestous Juma, Evelyn Fox Keller, Jürgen Kocka, Dominique Lecourt, Valentin Y. Mudimbe, Kinhide Mushakoji, Ilya Prigogine, Peter J. Taylor, Michel-Rolph Trouillot. Six of them were drawn from the social sciences, two from the natural sciences and two from the humanities. The commission sought to produce a book length work that would identify new directions for the organization of knowledge in the next fifty years. The report was published in 1996 by Stanford University as the book, Open the Social Sciences by Immanuel Wallerstein. To foster international debate, the report has been published in numerous languages including English, French, Portuguese, German, Dutch, Czech, Chinese, Korean, Spanish, Italian, Norwegian, Polish, Russian, Romanian, Serbocroat, Turkish, and Japanese.

== Debate ==
The ideas in the report have stimulated debate around the world. For example, in the Indian Magazine Frontline, Sundar Sarukkai discussed its conclusions and applicability to the Indian context, which he criticizes for being cliquish and unprofessional. In 2006 Michael Burawoy, at Berkeley, offered a highly critical perspective: "We hear nothing about how and where this new knowledge will be produced. Nor do we hear for whom this knowledge will be produced, nor for what ends. Instead we have an abstract and totalizing utopia that reflects the concerns of Western academics, perched high up in the ivory tower, seemingly unaware that the fortress beneath them – supporting them -- was under siege". This comment was made in spite of the fact that the commission itself included academics from the Caribbean, Africa, and East Asia, as well as Europe and North America. Richard Lee suggests concrete ways that the Commission's goal of breaking down barriers between the disciplines of the social sciences might be achieved.
