= European Union rapid reaction mechanism =

Streamlining of existing European Union law and Framework Law

The European Union rapid reaction mechanism (RRM) is a streamlining of existing European Union law and Framework Law regarding "the alleviation of crises, through human rights work, election monitoring, institution building, media support, border management, humanitarian missions, police training and the provision of police equipment, civil emergency assistance, rehabilitation, reconstruction, pacification, resettlement and mediation".

In 2007 the RRM was replaced by the Instrument for Stability.
