= Mónica Bettencourt-Dias =

Portuguese biochemist and cellular biologist

- Born: Mónica Bettencourt Carvalho; 1974 (age 51–52); Portugal
- Education: University of Lisbon; Instituto Gulbenkian de Ciência; University College London; University of Cambridge; Birkbeck College
- Occupation: Cellular biologist
- Years active: 2006–present
- Employer: Instituto Gulbenkian de Ciência

Mónica Bettencourt-Dias (born 1974) is a Portuguese biochemist and cellular biologist, who is the head of the Cell Cycle Regulation research group at the Instituto Gulbenkian de Ciência. Her research involves cell cycle regulation, for which she has been recognized as the recipient of the Pfizer Award for Basic Research, the Keith Porter Prize from the American Society for Cell Biology and the Eppendorf Young European Investigator Award. She was also selected as a 2009 European Molecular Biology Organization Young Investigator Fellow and inducted as a member of the EMBO in 2015. Mónica Bettencourt-Dias was appointed Director of Instituto Gulbenkian de Ciência in November, 2017.

== Biography ==
Monica Bettencourt Carvalho was born in 1974 and grew up in Lisbon, Portugal. When she was little, she wanted to be an Astrophysicist. She began her tertiary studies in biochemistry there at the University of Lisbon. After completion of her undergraduate degree, she entered a PhD program at the Instituto Gulbenkian de Ciência studying cell biology and completed her studies at University College London, earning a doctorate in biochemistry and molecular biology in 2001. Her research focused on the regeneration of heart cells in salamanders.

She enrolled at the University of Cambridge and simultaneously at Birkbeck College in London for her postdoctoral research. Her postdoctoral work focused on kinases, a type of enzyme critical to metabolism and cell signalling. She discovered that the kinase PLK4 regulates the number of centrosomes an organism develops. Her simultaneous studies were on scientific communication, to improve the way that scientists communicate with the public.

After completing her studies, Bettencourt returned to Portugal in 2006 and opened a laboratory at the Instituto Gulbenkian de Ciência to continue her work on "centriole formation, evolution and their physiological function". In 2007, she was awarded the Eppendorf Young European Investigator Award and in 2009 was selected as a European Molecular Biology Organization (EMBO) Young Investigator Fellow.

In 2010, she received a grant from the European Research Council to investigate abnormalities in centrioles and how the variance of their numbers or errors in cell division can lead to the development of tumors or infertility. Her research earned the Pfizer Award for Basic Research in 2012 and that same year, the Keith Porter Prize from the American Society for Cell Biology. She has authored numerous scientific papers and serves as editor for several scientific journals. In 2015, Bettencourt was inducted as a full member to the EMBO.

== Scientific leadership ==
Mónica Bettencourt-Dias is Director of the Instituto Gulbenkian de Ciência since 1 February 2018. She was Chair of EU-LIFE (2022-2023), the alliance of research institutes advocating for excellent research in Europe.

Bettencourt-Dias is also a key figure in the USA-PT Initiative against Cancer (UPIC), a partnership fostering trans-Atlantic collaboration. She serves on the selection committee for the initiative's International Portugal-USA Summer Course in Cancer Research, which facilitates scientist exchanges and training between the two nations.

== Selected works ==
- Bettencourt-Dias, Mónica; Glover, David M (2007). "Nature Reviews. Molecular Cell Biology". Nature. 8 (6). London, England: Nature Publishing Group: 451–463. doi:10.1038/nrm2180. PMID 17505520. S2CID 33639281.
- Bettencourt-Dias, Mónica; Carvalho-Santos, Zita (2008). "Double life of centrioles: CP110 in the spotlight". Trends in Cell Biology. 18 (1): 8–11. doi:10.1016/j.tcb.2007.11.002. PMID 18068367.
- Bettencourt-Dias, Mónica; Glover, David M (September 2009). "SnapShot: Centriole Biogenesis". Cell. 136 (1): 188.e1–188.e2. doi:10.1016/j.cell.2008.12.035. PMID 19135899. S2CID 43522520.
- Bettencourt-Dias, Mónica; Hildebrandt, Friedhelm; et al. (2011). "Centrosomes and cilia in human disease". Trends in Genetics. 27 (8): 307–315. doi:10.1016/j.tig.2011.05.004. PMC 3144269. PMID 21680046.
- Bettencourt-Dias, Mónica (December 2013). "Q&A: Who needs a centrosome?". BMC Biology. 11 (1): 28. doi:10.1186/1741-7007-11-28. PMC 3623764. PMID 23578281.
