= António Coutinho =

Portuguese immunologist

- Born: António Manuel Pinto Amaral Coutinho; 8 October 1946 (age 79); Aveiro, Portugal
- Education: University of Lisbon; Karolinska Institute
- Known for: Research on lymphocyte activation, natural antibodies, immune tolerance and autoimmunity
- Scientific career
- Fields: Immunology
- Workplaces: Basel Institute for Immunology; Umeå University; CNRS; Pasteur Institute; Instituto Gulbenkian de Ciência

António Manuel Pinto Amaral Coutinho (born 8 October 1946) is a Portuguese immunologist known for work on lymphocyte activation, natural antibodies, immune tolerance, autoimmunity and the relationship between innate and adaptive immunity. He was director of the Instituto Gulbenkian de Ciência in Oeiras, Portugal, from 1998 to 2012, and has held research and teaching positions in Sweden, Switzerland, France and Portugal.

== Early life and education ==
Coutinho was born in Aveiro, Portugal, on 8 October 1946. He received a medical degree from the Faculty of Medicine of the University of Lisbon in 1969. He then undertook doctoral studies at the Karolinska Institute in Stockholm, Sweden, where he completed a PhD in medical microbiology in 1974.

== Career ==
From 1975 to 1979, Coutinho was a researcher at the Basel Institute for Immunology in Switzerland, then directed by Niels Kaj Jerne. In 1979 he became professor and director of the Department of Immunology at the medical school of Umeå University in Sweden.

In 1980, Coutinho joined the scientific staff of the French National Centre for Scientific Research (CNRS). He subsequently created the Immunobiology Unit at the Pasteur Institute in Paris, which he directed from 1982 to 1998. He was also director of the Pasteur Institute’s Department of Immunology from 1991 to 1994.

Coutinho was appointed director of the Instituto Gulbenkian de Ciência (IGC) in 1998. He directed the institute until 2012. During his tenure, the IGC expanded its graduate training activities, including PhD programmes developed with Alexandre Quintanilha and Paulo Vieira, which were intended to train a new generation of integrated biologists in Portugal.

Coutinho has also been a visiting professor at institutions including the Massachusetts Institute of Technology and the University of São Paulo, and held appointments or elected professorships associated with the University of Geneva and Lund University. He later served as a visiting professor of immunology at the Faculty of Medicine of the University of Lisbon.

== Research ==
Coutinho’s scientific work has focused on the operation of the immune system, including lymphocyte activation, immune tolerance and the connection between tolerance and autoimmune disease. His publications include studies on the origin and function of natural autoantibodies, a subject he linked to immune regulation, homeostasis and repertoire selection.

He also contributed to research on innate immune recognition. A 2003 review by Coutinho and Alexander Poltorak discussed the relationship between earlier work on lymphocyte mitogens and the later characterization of Toll-like receptors, which are now central to understanding how innate immune activation shapes adaptive immune responses.

According to the Federal University of Minas Gerais, Coutinho has authored more than 400 scientific articles, and his research group made fundamental contributions to the study of the physiological operation of the immune system, the development of immune tolerance and autoimmune disease.

== Honours and distinctions ==
Coutinho is a member of the European Molecular Biology Organization (EMBO), the Portuguese Academy of Medicine and the Brazilian Academy of Sciences, and is an honorary member of the Portuguese Society for Immunology. UFMG described him as one of the 100 most influential immunology researchers in the world according to the Institute for Scientific Information, and as the only Portuguese researcher in that ranking.

== Selected publications ==
- Coutinho, Antonio (1995). "Natural autoantibodies". Current Opinion in Immunology. 7 (6): 812–818. doi:10.1016/0952-7915(95)80053-0. PMID 8679125.
- Coutinho, Antonio (2002). "Immunology at the crossroads". EMBO Reports. 3 (11): 1008–1011. doi:10.1093/embo-reports/kvf226. PMC 1307589. PMID 12429607.
- Coutinho, Antonio; Poltorak, Alexander (2003). "Innate immunity: from lymphocyte mitogens to Toll-like receptors". Current Opinion in Immunology. 15 (6): 599–602. doi:10.1016/j.coi.2003.09.001. PMID 14630190.

== See also ==
- Basel Institute for Immunology
- Instituto Gulbenkian de Ciência
- Immunology
- Natural antibody
- Immune tolerance
- Toll-like receptor
