= Law enforcement and society =

The first modern police force, commonly said to be the London Metropolitan Police, established in 1829, promoted the preventive role of police as a deterrent to urban crime and disorder.

Law enforcement, however, has only ever constituted a small portion of policing activity. Policing has included an array of activities in different contexts, but the predominant ones are concerned with the preservation of order and the provision of services.

== History ==
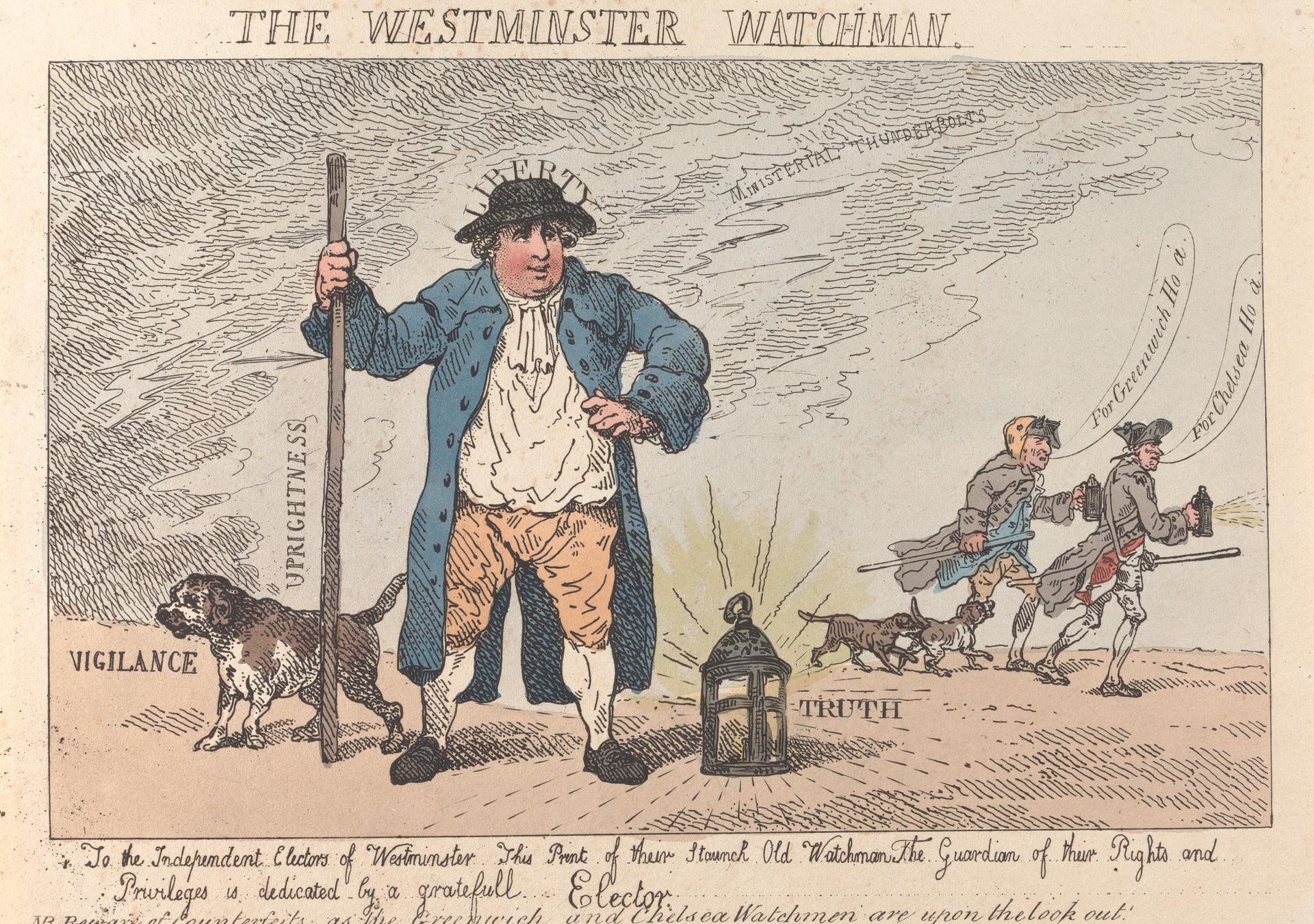

In some societies, in the late 18th century and early 19th century, these developed within the context of maintaining a layered societal structure and the protection of property.

In the United Kingdom in the late 18th century:

The modern police department was born out of...the desire of the wealthy to restructure ... society. The swelling population of urban poor, whose miniscule [sic] wages could hardly sustain them, heightened the need for police protection.

In the United States in the 19th century:

The police role was only minimally directed at law enforcement. Its primary function was serving as the enforcement arm of the reigning political power, protecting property, and keeping control of the ever increasing numbers of foreign immigrants

In 1690 John Locke wrote that:

The great and chief end ... of men's uniting into commonwealths, and putting themselves under government, is the preservation of their property

Similarly, Adam Smith described how:

... as the necessity of civil government gradually grows up with the acquisition of valuable property, so the principal causes which naturally introduce subordination gradually grow up with the growth of that valuable property ... Wherever there is great property there is great inequality. For one very rich man there must be at least five hundred poor, and the affluence of the few supposes the indigence of the many. The affluence of the rich excites the indignation of the poor, who are often both driven by want, and prompted by envy, to invade his possessions ... The appropriation of herds and flocks which introduced an inequality of fortune was that which first gave rise to regular government. Till there be property there can be no government, the very end of which is to secure wealth, and to defend the rich from the poor

This close link between property and government (and thus police function) was also noted by John Jay, who repeatedly said that:

Those who own the country ought to govern it.

According to Monaghan, this:

was one of his favorite maxims

and by US Founding Father James Madison. who declared that government:

... our government ought to secure the permanent interests of the country against innovation. Landholders ought to have a share in the government, to support these invaluable interests and to balance and check the other. They ought to be so constituted as to protect the minority of the opulent against the majority.

Considering the state of law enforcement and society in 2013, Dr. Gary Potter states,

As we look to the 21st century, it now appears likely that a new emphasis on science and technology, particularly related to citizen surveillance; a new wave of militarization reflected in the spread of SWAT teams and other paramilitary squads; and a new emphasis on community pacification through community policing, are all destined to replay the failures of history as the policies of the future.

== See also ==
- The Thin Blue Line
- Law enforcement agency
- State police
- Police
