= Instrument for Stability =

European Union instrument

The Instrument for Stability (IfS, more commonly referred to as the Stability Instrument) was a financial and political instrument at the disposal of the European Union. It was prepared at strategic level by the EEAS and implemented by the European Commission. In 2021 the IfS was merged into Global Europe.

The objective was three-fold:

1. Respond to urgent needs due to political instability or a major disaster;
2. Build the conditions for long term stability in particular by addressing some major risks and threats that prevent political security and economic development, such as terrorism, organized crime, illicit trafficking, chemical-biological-nuclear risks but also new challenges such as pandemics, cybercrime, climate change or the protection of critical infrastructure;
3. Participate to the crisis management cycle by supporting CSDP operations and by contributing to restore stability after the crisis or the conflict.

The Instrument for Stability was proposed by the Commission in September 2004 and created by the Council and Parliament on 15 November 2006 through Regulation No 1717/2006. It replaces the Rapid Reaction Mechanism (RRM), which was considered unwieldy as it could only finance projects of up to six months. In 2011 negotiations began for the next EU Multi-annual Financial Framework (MFF) 2014-2020 including the legal basis for the Instrument for Stability for the period. The independent foundation the European Centre for Development Policy Management (ECDPM) suggested that while the IfS was a useful instrument for conflict prevention and peacebuilding that it was not appropriate for it to be the only EU financial instrument that should include them as a key consideration for the period 2014 - 2020.

== Purpose ==
The purpose of the Instrument for Stability is to support measures aimed at safeguarding or re-establishing the conditions under which the partner countries of the European Union can pursue their long term development goals. The main added value of the IfS is its ability to provide support to the political strategy of the European Union in a third country.

The IfS may be deployed for crisis response and crisis preparedness (such a limited window of opportunity to prevent or resolve conflict, situations threatening to escalate into armed conflict or severe destabilisation, or the urgent need to secure the conditions for the delivery of aid by the European Union), including in the case of major natural disaster. Besides tackling immediate crises or catastrophes in third countries, the IfS also addresses trans-regional risks and threats that are either natural or criminal in nature and may jeopardize the health, environment, economic development and safety conditions of people in the region. This trans-regional approach provided by the Instrument for Stability complements national measures provided by EU geographical instruments and contributes to strengthen the rule of law, good governance, safety and security at regional level. Regional centers of excellence (so called CBRN Centers of Excellence) are being established in five key regions of the world (the Middle East, South East Asia, Caucasus, Central Asia and Africa) to operate this transregional approach. These regional centers (CoEs) will be a platform of coordination and cooperation between donors and recipients in the field of safety and security.

The IfS can only finance operations where other financial instruments cannot respond within the timeframe necessary. In specific, the IfS cannot finance humanitarian assistance (which is the responsibility of ECHO) or finance projects that are longer than 18 months (which the commission should be able to finance through the regular financial instruments). In addition, specialised short-term financing instruments already exist for specific crises. These include regulations on food aid, human rights and democratisation, mine action and rehabilitation.

== Deployment ==
For the deployment of the IfS, a simplified decision-making process is used. The Commission may adopt measures which apply immediately. The commission is assisted by a committee (composed of the representatives of the Member States and chaired by the representative of the commission, who does not vote in the committee), which is kept informed of all IfS measures taken by the commission. If the commission's actions are not in accordance with the opinion of the committee, the Council will immediately be informed, which may then overrule the Commission within 30 days, voting by qualified majority. The European Parliament, meanwhile, is informed by the Commission of committee proceedings on a regular basis.

== Budget ==
The total budget for the period 2007-2013 is €2 billion, of which a maximum of 27% (ca. €550 million) will be spent on longer-term EC responses to global and trans-regional threats. The remaining 73% are earmarked for rapid initial responses to situations of political crisis and natural disasters.

== See also ==
- ECHO
- Civilian Peacekeeping Mission in Aceh
