= Gulbenkian Park =

Garden in Lisbon, Portugal

Gulbenkian Park Gulbenkian Garden Santa Gertrudes Park
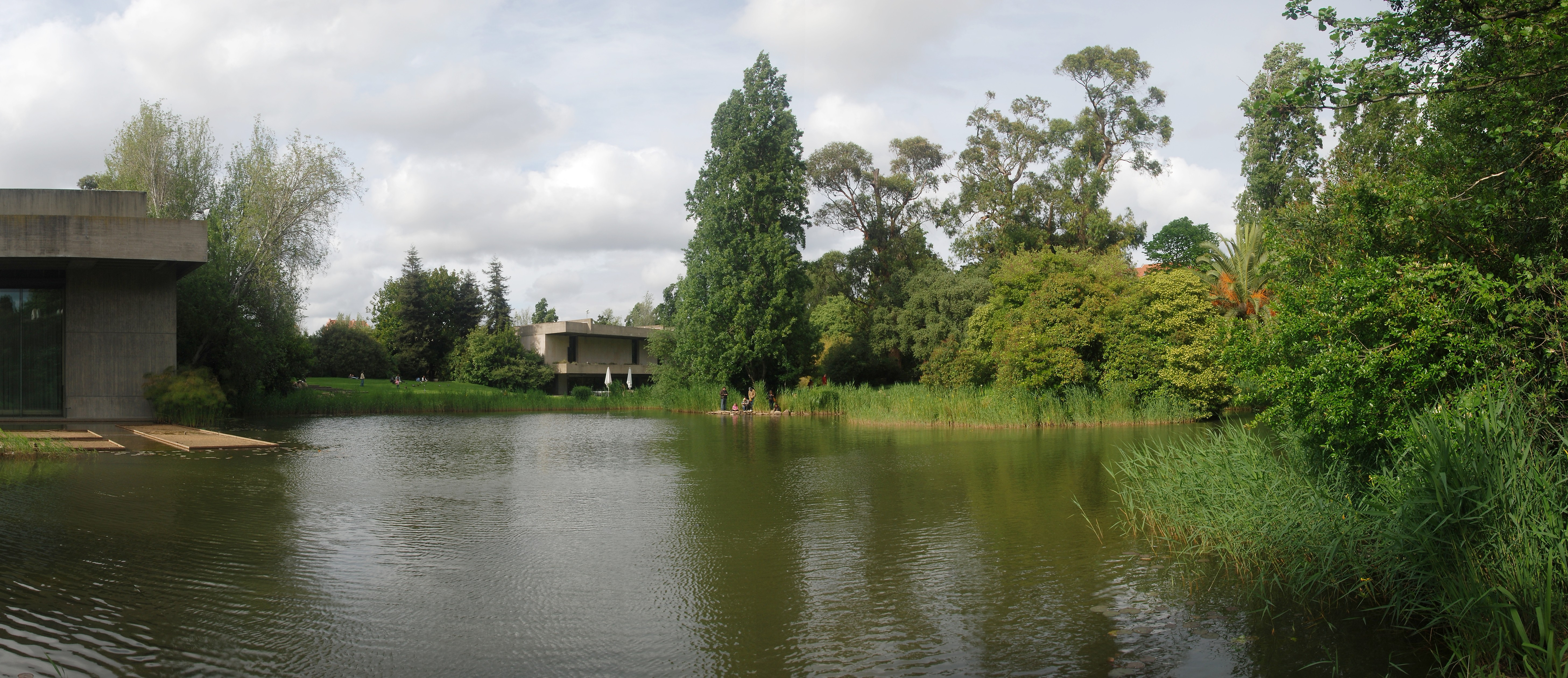
- Calouste Gulbenkian Foundation gardens in Lisbon, Portugal
- Interactive map of Gulbenkian Park; Gulbenkian Garden; Santa Gertrudes Park
- Type: Urban park
- Location: Avenida de Berna, Lisbon, Portugal
- Coordinates: 38.7368362°N 9.1538524°W
- Area: 7.5 hectares (19 acres)
- Created: Gonçalo Ribeiro Telles and António Viana Barreto
- Operator: Calouste Gulbenkian Foundation

The Gulbenkian Park also known as Gulbenkian Garden is located in Lisbon, Portugal. It was created in 1969 and is part of the cultural center where the headquarters of the Calouste Gulbenkian Foundation, Gulbenkian Museum and the José de Azeredo Perdigão Modern Art Centre are situated enriching the cultural importance of the garden.

The park is spread over an area of 7.5 hectares (19 acres) and has one large and another small lake within it.

== History ==
The park was inaugurated in 1969. It was the parkland of the former Palacio Azambuja or dos Meninos de Palhavã in 1918 and the Spanish Embassy used to be located here. The park was sold in 1957. The park was designed by the landscape architects Gonçalo Ribeiro Telles and António Facco Vianna Barreto in close collaboration with Alberto Pessoa, Pedro Cid and Ruy Athouguia who were architects of the buildings of the Calouste Gulbenkian Foundation erected in the park; Armenian oil tycoon and art collector Calouste Gulbenkian played an important role in the post-war cultural life of Lisbon. Its gardens are pleasant and the art center is contemporary.

== Features ==
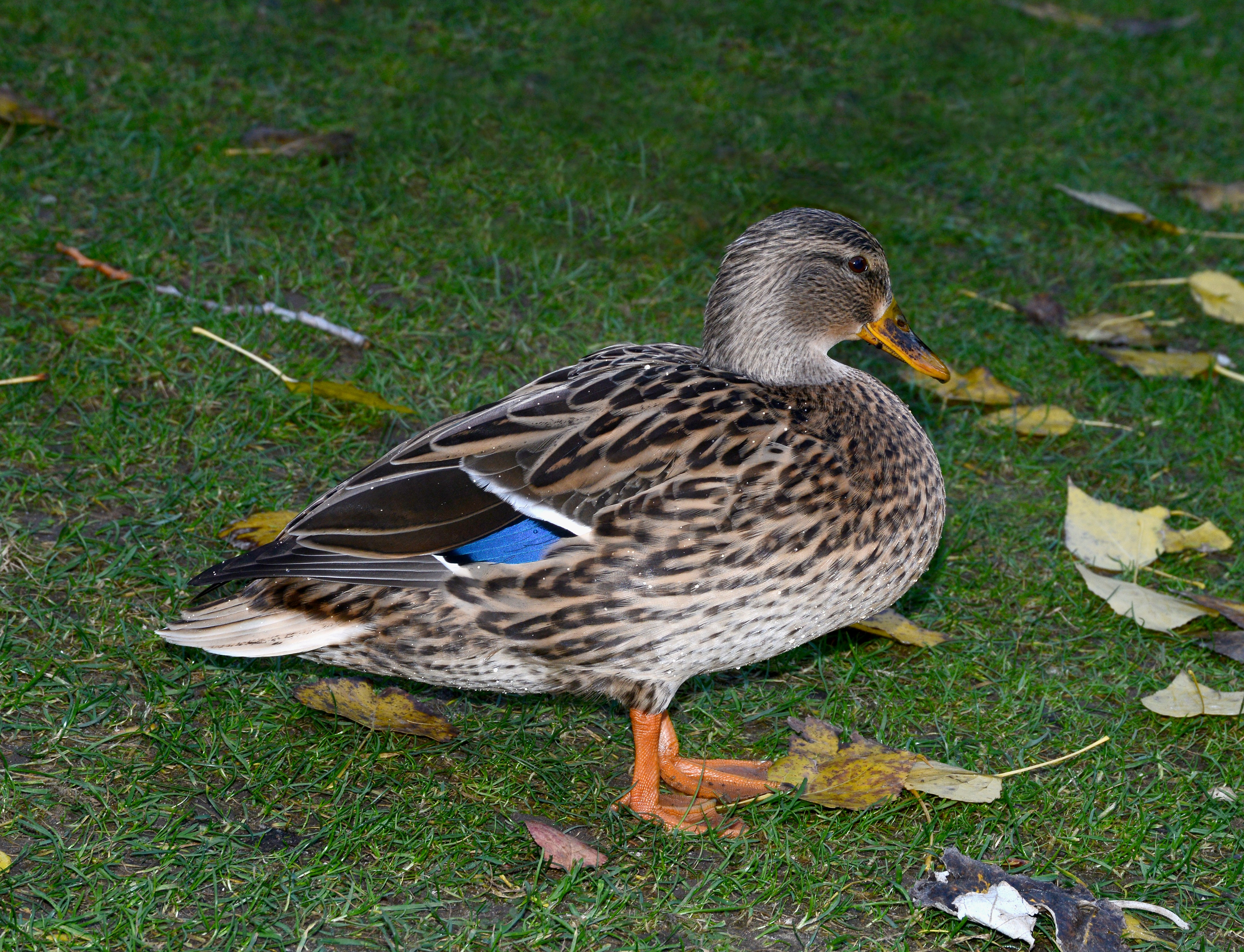
A mallard in the park

The lawns have been tended to fit the natural landscape right up to the central lake. The stream inlets in the park are crossed by small bridges, and paths are well laid out to stroll around. Irises and waterside marginals are planted along the course of the streams.

The land area has been modified to build not only the structures but also create a lake environment. The floral collection planted in the park has been done very selectively with well laid footpaths to stroll through the gardens.

The natural vegetation chosen consists of feathery pampas grass, Brazilian pepper (Schinus terebinthifolia) tree with small leaves, ribbon gum, Turkey oak, eucalyptus and poplars. There is also rose garden within the park.

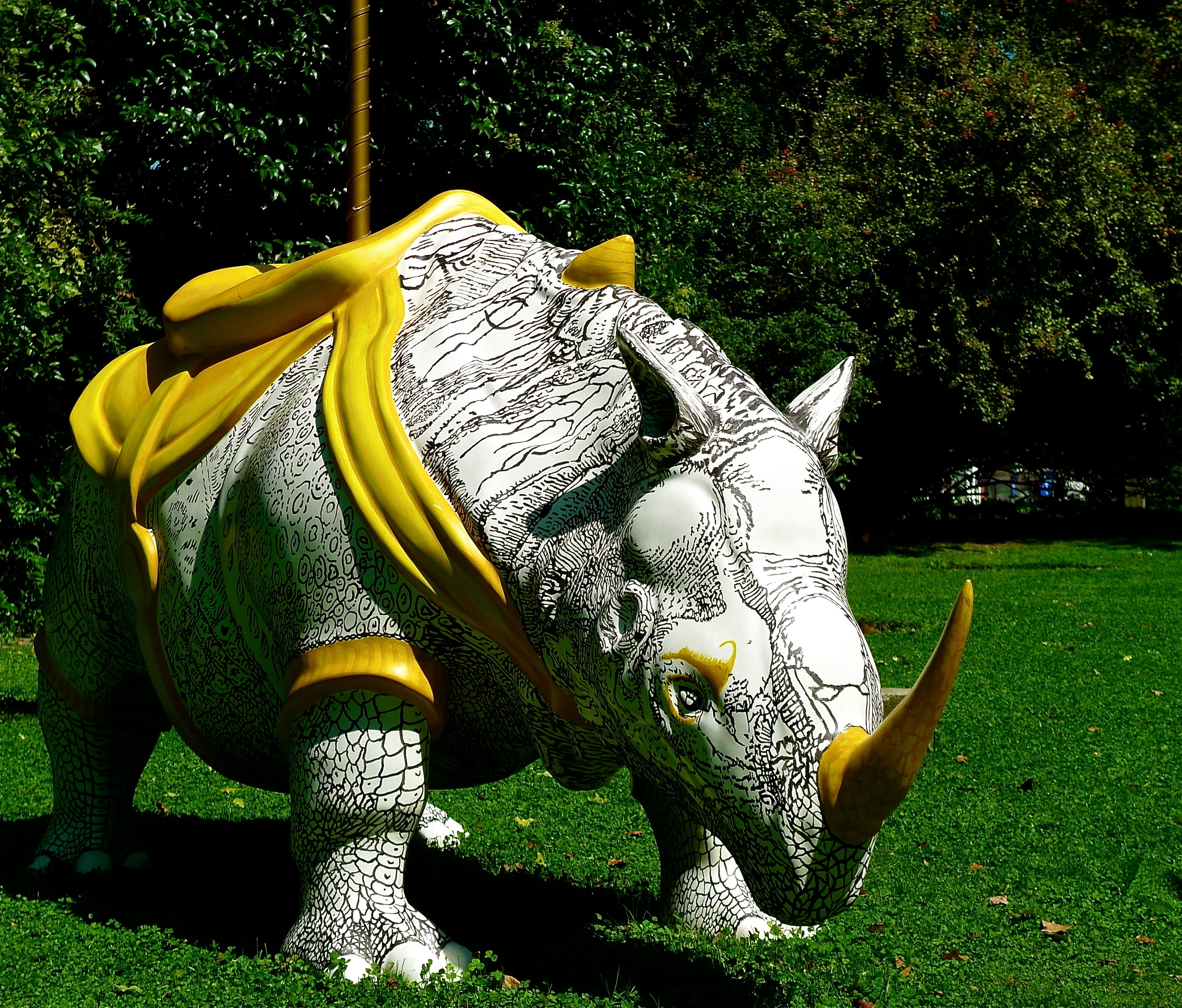
Animal sculpture in the park

Of the two lakes built in the garden, the larger lake, located in the centre of the park, is the habitat for water birds such as mallard, moorhen, ring-necked parakeet, white wagtail, wren, blackbird, blackcap, house sparrow, serin, and greenfinch. In view of thick bushes around the lake, the park is a preferred location for moorhens to breed. The small lake is also a habitat for water birds.

The garden also has an open-air amphitheater to seat 1,000 people which has the lake as its backdrop. The amphitheater is the venue for holding many programmes on dance, drama, and music. Jazz music programme is held in the gardens every year during first two weeks of August.

The park is also enlivened with statues and sculptures made by national and international artists which are fixed strategically at many places.

== See also ==
- Gulbenkian Museum
- José de Azeredo Perdigão Modern Art Centre
- Calouste Gulbenkian Foundation
- Calouste Gulbenkian

== Bibliography ==
- Boulton, Susie (1 March 2013). DK Eyewitness Travel Guide: Lisbon. DK Publishing. ISBN 978-1-4654-0955-3.
- Segall, Barbara (1999). Garden Lover's Guide to Spain and Portugal. Princeton Architectural Press. ISBN 978-1-56898-161-1.
- Tranaeus, Tomas (3 June 2013). Top 10 Lisbon. DK Publishing. ISBN 978-1-4654-1317-8.
