= Bernard van Leer Foundation =

The Bernard van Leer Foundation funds and shares knowledge about work in early childhood development. The foundation was established in 1949 and is based in the Netherlands. It is a member of the Network of European Foundations for Innovative Cooperation (NEF). The foundation's income is derived from the bequest of Bernard van Leer, a Dutch industrialist and philanthropist who lived from 1883 to 1958, and made his fortune from the packaging company he founded in 1919, Royal Packaging Industries Van Leer and is a member of the Van Leer family. After Bernard van Leer's death in 1958, the foundation was given a clearer organisation and focus by his son Oscar Van Leer. From 1964, the Bernard van Leer Foundation focused on young children, primary education and youth, and disadvantaged young children. It funded its first international project in Jamaica in 1966.

The foundation's income is channeled through the Van Leer Group Foundation, which also funds the Jerusalem Film Centre and the Van Leer Jerusalem Institute. The members of the Van Leer Group Foundation's governing council also form the board of trustees of the Bernard van Leer Foundation. In the late 1990s, the Van Leer Group Foundation sold Royal Packaging Industries Van Leer, which it had fully owned, and now derives its income from a venture capital company and a global portfolio of equities, securities and property. The foundation has contributed to the development of the early childhood care and education sector in Jamaica and the Preschool Education Project in Kenya.

According to the OECD, Bernard van Leer Foundation’s financing for 2019 development increased by 3% to US$14.3 million.
