= Calouste Gulbenkian Foundation =

Portuguese cultural and scientific institution

Coordinates: 38°44′14″N 9°9′15″W

- Fundação Calouste Gulbenkian
- Logo of the foundation

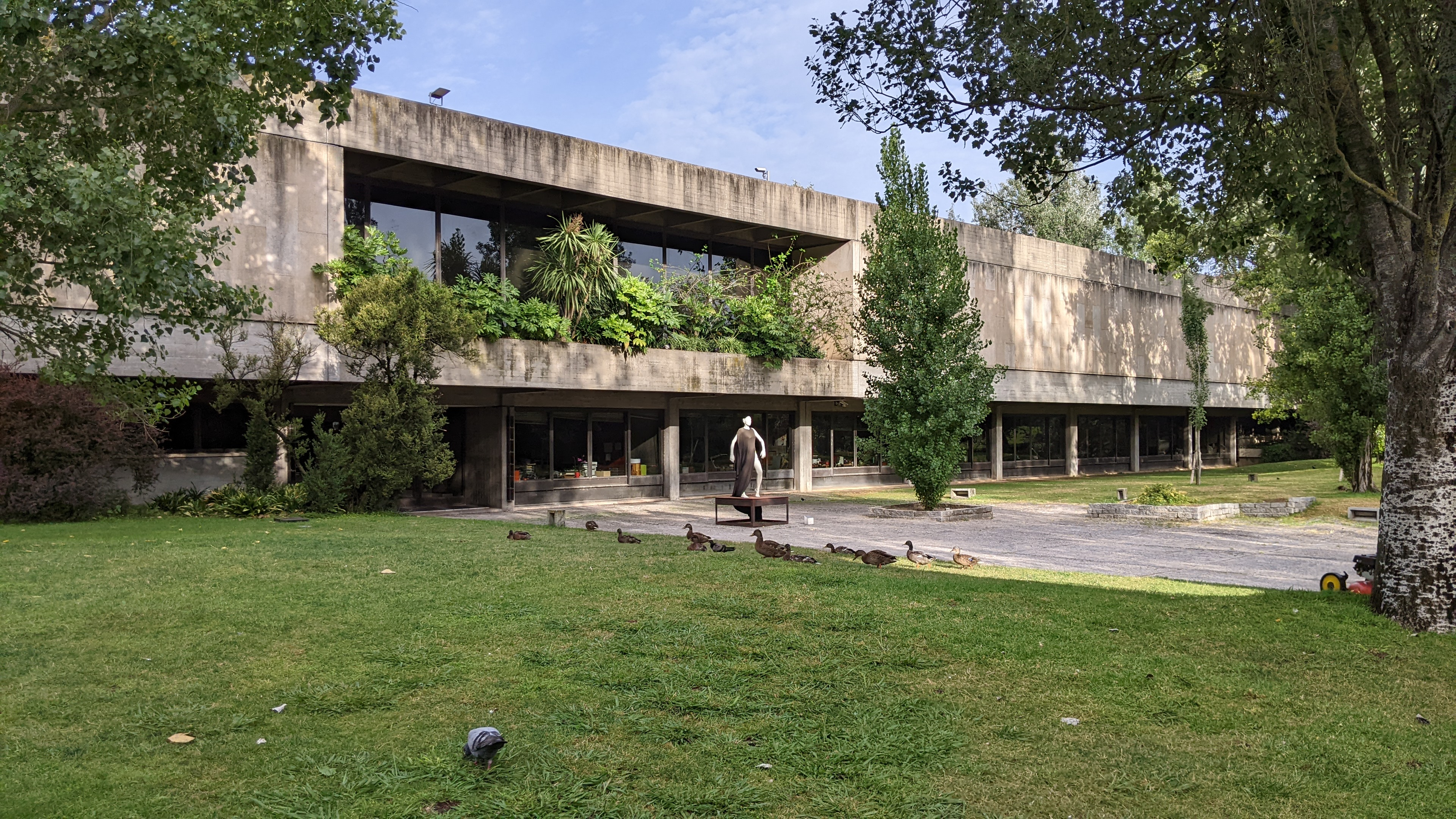
- Headquarters of the Calouste Gulbenkian Foundation in Lisbon
- Founded: 18 July 1956
- Founder: Calouste Sarkis Gulbenkian
- Type: Private foundation
- Purpose: Arts, science, & education
- Location: Lisbon, Portugal
- President of the Board: António M. Feijó
- Revenue: €169.5 million (2017)
- Endowment: €3.9 billion (2017)
- Website: Official Website

The Calouste Gulbenkian Foundation (Portuguese: Fundação Calouste Gulbenkian), commonly referred to simply as the Gulbenkian Foundation, is a Portuguese institution dedicated to the promotion of the arts, philanthropy, science, and education. One of the wealthiest charitable foundations in the world, the Gulbenkian Foundation was founded on 18 July 1956 according to the last will and testament of Calouste Sarkis Gulbenkian, an Armenian Portugal-based oil magnate who bequeathed his assets to the country in the form of a foundation.

Gulbenkian had one of the largest private art collections in Europe, which is housed in the foundation's Calouste Gulbenkian Museum in Lisbon. The foundation hosts numerous institutions and initiatives including the Gulbenkian Orchestra, Gulbenkian Science Institute, Gulbenkian Prizes and the Gulbenkian Commission.

== Organization ==
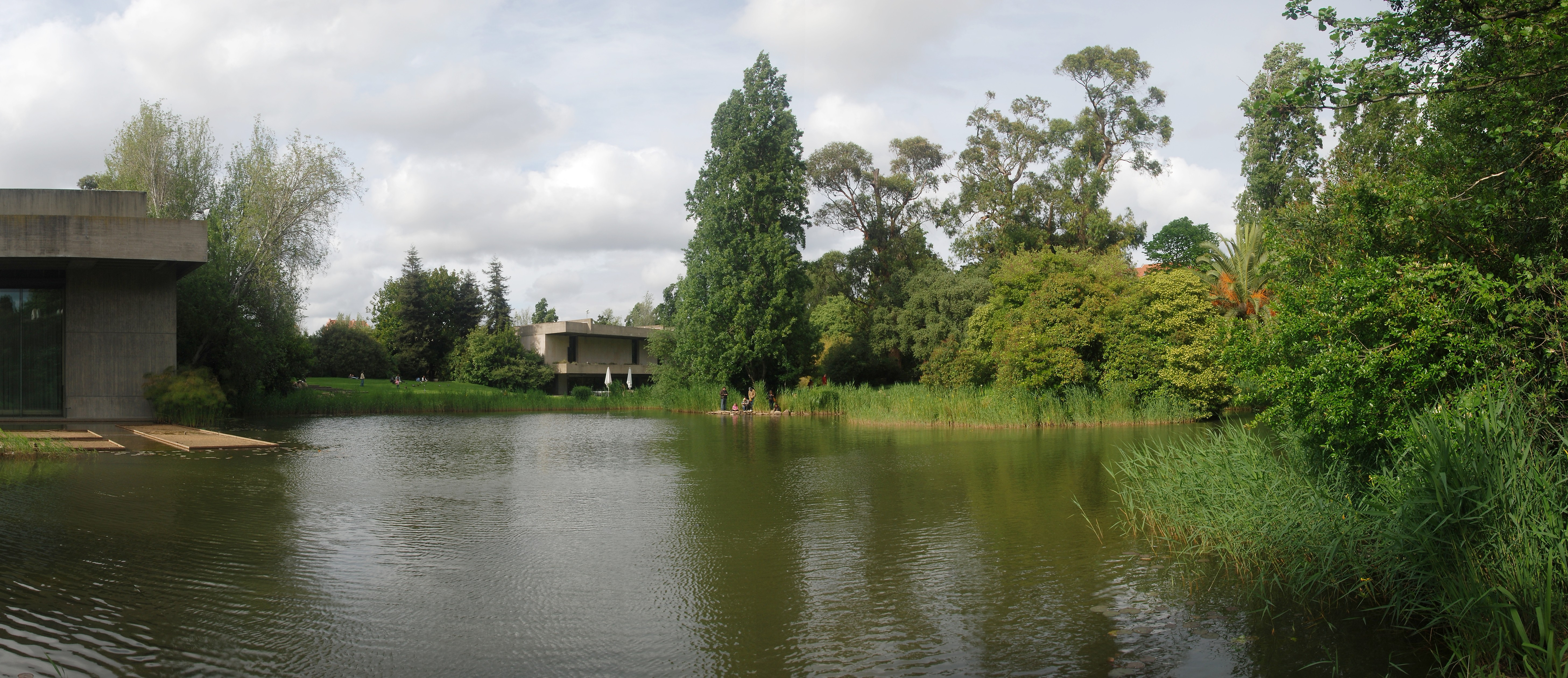
Gulbenkian Park of the Gulbenkian Foundation and Museum

Located in Lisbon (civil parish of Avenidas Novas), the Foundation's premises opened in 1969 and were designed by Ruy Athouguia, Pedro Cid, and Alberto Pessoa. In addition to Foundation offices, the complex includes an auditorium, exhibition space, congress facilities, and a large building designed specifically to house and display Museum and art library. These are set in Gulbenkian Park, which was designed by Ribeiro Telles. In 1983, the Modern Art Centre was added at one end of the park.

=== Calouste Gulbenkian Museum ===
The Calouste Gulbenkian Museum (Portuguese: Museu Calouste Gulbenkian), founded in conformity with his last will and testament, accommodates his collection of mostly ancient and classical art, but including some individual modern pieces.

=== Instituto Gulbenkian de Ciência ===
The Instituto Gulbenkian de Ciência (IGC, a science institute) is not situated on the same premises but its own complex in Oeiras (outskirts of Lisbon), near the palace of the Marquis of Pombal. The institute is an international centre for biological and biomedical research and graduate training. Founded in 1961, the IGC is organised in small independent research groups that work in an environment designed to encourage interactions with minimal hierarchical structure. The scientific programme is multidisciplinary, including Cell and Developmental biology, Evolutionary biology, Immunology, Host-pathogen interaction, Disease Genetics, Plant Biology, Neurosciences, Theoretical and Computational biology.

=== Gulbenkian Orchestra ===
The Gulbenkian Orchestra (Portuguese: Orquestra Gulbenkian) is a Portuguese symphony orchestra based in Lisbon. The orchestra primarily gives concerts at the 1,228-seat Grande Auditório (Grand Auditorium) of the Foundation's main premises. Established in 1962 as the Orquestra de Câmara Gulbenkian (Gulbenkian Chamber Orchestra) with 12 musicians, it has subsequently expanded in size and took on its current name in 1971.

=== Gulbenkian Ballet ===
Gulbenkian ballet was a Portuguese classical dance troupe created in 1965 by the Foundation as Centro Português do Bailado. Its programme directors were Walter Gore (1965–1969), Milko Sparembeck (1969–1975), Jorge Salavisa (1977–1996), Iracity Cardoso (1996–2003) and Paulo Ribeiro (2003–2005). The project was terminated in 2005.

=== Gulbenkian Choir ===
Gulbenkian Choir (Portuguese: Coro Gulbenkian) is a musical choir project established by the Foundation in 1964 as the Gulbenkian Chamber Choir (Coro de Câmara Gulbenkian) directed by Olga Violante (1964–1969). Since then the choir made up of an average 100 members is directed by Michel Corboz.

=== Branches ===
The Calouste Gulbenkian Foundation also has a delegation in the United Kingdom (UK Branch) and a centre in Paris (the Calouste Gulbenkian Cultural Centre). The Foundation's Armenian Communities Department has a unique and separate long-running mission in aiding Armenia and Diasporan Armenian projects. It is a member of the Network of European Foundations for Innovative Cooperation (NEF). The mission statement of the UK Branch desires to change perceptions, build relationships, reduce social exclusion and preserve the environment and innovative partnerships.

=== Publishing ===
The foundation publishes books on a range of topics, including arts, education and languages.

== Partex ==
Partex, a Portuguese oil extraction company, was fully owned by the Calouste Gulbenkian Foundation until it was sold in June 2019 to a Thai company.

== Gulbenkian Foundation in the Armenian communities ==
The Calouste Gulbenkian Foundation is very active in the Armenian community worldwide due to its founder Calouste Gulbenkian being of Armenian ethnicity. The Foundation has its Armenian Communities Department headed by Razmik Panossian. The Foundation's Armenian Communities Department distributes scholarships in the form of grants and bourses to Armenian students worldwide in pursuant of education worldwide. The Foundation continues to be active in Armenia and throughout the Armenian diaspora. It also supports the promotion and preservation of the Armenian language, in particular Western Armenian, primarily used by the Armenian diaspora, as well as supporting Armenian schools throughout the world, including Armenian societies, history, culture, churches, media, sports, etc.

== Gulbenkian Commission ==
The Gulbenkian Commission sought to address inadequacies in the organization of the social science disciplines that developed in the nineteenth century by indicating a direction for social scientific inquiry for the next 50 years. It was founded by the Calouste Gulbenkian Foundation. It held three meetings in 1994 and 1995.

== Honours ==
- Grand-Cross of the Order of Merit, Portugal (20 June 1960)
- Honorary Member of the Military Order of Saint James of the Sword, Portugal (7 August 1981)
- Honorary Member of the Order of Prince Henry, Portugal (13 August 1986)
- Honorary Member of the Order of Liberty, Portugal (20 July 2016)

== See also ==
- List of wealthiest charitable foundations
- Centro de Arte Moderna Gulbenkian
- Museu Calouste Gulbenkian
- Gulbenkian commission
- Gulbenkian Orchestra
- Gulbenkian Science Institute
- Museum of the Year, formerly the Gulbenkian Prize
- List of theatres and auditoriums in Lisbon
