= Lício Velloso =

Brazilian physician and researcher

- Born: Lício Augusto Velloso; June 12, 1963 (age 62); Belo Horizonte, Minas Gerais, Brazil
- Citizenship: Brazil
- Education: State University of Campinas
- Occupations: Physician, Researcher
- Employer: State University of Campinas
- Notable work: Glutamate decarboxilase as an autoantigen in type 1 diabetes mellitus (1994)
- Awards: Capes Thesis Award (2006)

Lício Augusto Velloso (June 12, 1963) is a Brazilian physician and scientist who studies molecular and cellular mechanisms involved in the genesis of obesity and diabetes mellitus. Since May 2014, he has been a full member of the Brazilian Academy of Sciences (ABC). He is considered one of the leading obesity researchers in Brazil.

== Biography ==
Born in Belo Horizonte, capital of Minas Gerais, Velloso moved to Campinas, in the interior of the state of São Paulo, to study medicine at the State University of Campinas (Unicamp). He graduated from university in 1986. He specialized in surgery at the same institution in 1989.

The following year, he moved to Uppsala, Sweden, to study for his doctorate. At Uppsala University, he obtained his doctorate with the thesis Glutamate decarboxylase as an autoantigen in type 1 diabetes mellitus.

After obtaining his PhD from the Swedish university, he began a postdoctoral fellowship at Unicamp under the supervision of Professor Mario José Abdalla Saad, with a scholarship from National Council for Scientific and Technological Development (CNPq) between 1994 and 1997. During 1995, he conducted another postdoctoral research at the Joslin Diabetes Center at Harvard University under the supervision of Professor Ron Kahn.

He is one of Brazil's most renowned researchers in medical research on obesity and is the Coordinator of the Cell Signaling Laboratory at Unicamp, where he and his team of scientists study the molecular and cellular mechanisms that lead to the onset of obesity and diabetes. He is a professor at Unicamp, a member of the São Paulo State Academy of Sciences (Aciesp), and since 2014 has been a member of the Brazilian Academy of Sciences (ABC). Among his achievements is the demonstration that eating diets rich in saturated fats causes damage to the hypothalamus—the region of the brain that controls hunger. Such damage results from the activation of an inflammatory response. The persistence of this inflammation can lead to the death of neurons, making the treatment of this disease even more difficult. Advances in his research have enabled the development of methods to study the function of the hypothalamus in human patients, which has helped to draw parallels between the disease in experimental models and in humans.

== Prizes ==
Among the awards he has received are the Capes Thesis Award for Thesis Carl Peter von Dietrich in 2006, as advisor for the thesis "Co-Activator-1 of the Peroxisome Proliferator-Activated Receptor (PGC-1): a gene transcription co-activator involved in the control of insulin secretion and peripheral action" produced by Claudio Teodoro de Souza, at the time a doctoral student at Unicamp.

== Articles ==
- "Definition of in situ hypothalamic inflammation as an important mechanism involved in the hypothalamic dysfunction in obesity". Endocrinology 146: 4192, 2005.
- "Identification of TLR4 as a triggering mechanism for hypothalamic inflammation in obesity". J Neurosci 29: 359, 2009.
- "Demonstration of molecular crosstalk between insulin and angiotensin II signaling pathways". PNAS 93: 12490, 1996.
- "Demonstration of neuronal apoptosis in the hypothalamus of animal models of obesity". PLoS One 4: e5045, 2009..
