= Farmiga =

Farmiga is a surname. Notable people with the surname include:

- Adriana Farmiga (born 1974), American visual artist, curator, and professor
- Taissa Farmiga (born 1994), American actress
- Vera Farmiga (born 1973), American actress, director, and producer
