= Instituto Gulbenkian de Ciência =

Portuguese research centre

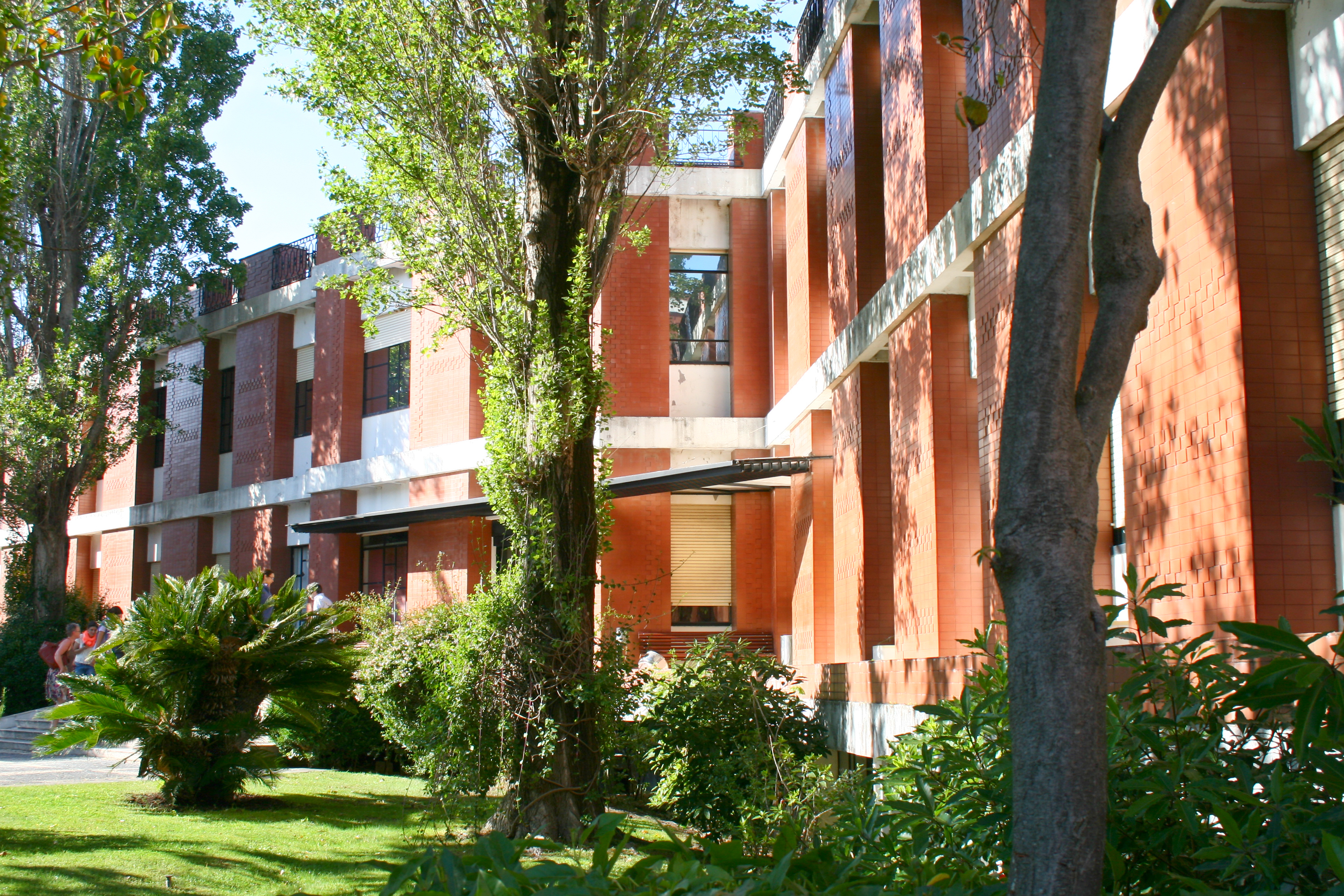
- IGC campus in Oeiras, Portugal
- Merged into: Gulbenkian Institute of Molecular Medicine
- Founded: In 1961 by the Calouste Gulbenkian Foundation
- Purpose: Biological and biomedical research, and graduate education
- Headquarters: Rua da Quinta Grande, 6; 2780-156 Oeiras, Portugal
- Coordinates: 38.6908674°N 9.3179117°W
- Members: 412 staff (December 2017)
- Director: Mónica Bettencourt-Dias
- Website: www.igc.gulbenkian.pt

The Instituto Gulbenkian de Ciência (IGC) was an international centre for biological and biomedical research and graduate training based in Oeiras, Portugal. Founded by the Calouste Gulbenkian Foundation (FCG) in 1961, and was supported by the Foundation until it merged with Instituto de Medicina Molecular to become Gulbenkian Institute of Molecular Medicine on October 1st 2024. The IGC was organised in small independent research groups that work in an environment designed to encourage interactions with minimal hierarchical structure.

The scientific programme covered a wide range of domains and was at the interface of different disciplines. These included cell and developmental biology, evolutionary biology, immunology and host-pathogen interaction, plant biology, sociobiology, computational biology and biophysics.

All resources were at the disposal of all IGC scientists equally, and common services and equipment were also open to external users.

The IGC hosted a number of graduate education and training programmes. Since 1993 the IGC ran innovative PhD programmes, directed towards intellectual breadth, creativity and independent scientific thought. Also, the IGC had a strong tradition in promoting science in society with dedicated outreach programmes.

Around 400 people, including 300 researchers (students, postdocs, technicians and group leaders), from 41 different countries worked at the IGC. Since 1998, 88 research groups have already settled in the institute. Of these, 44 went to other institutions, mainly other research centres and universities in Portugal.

In 1998, under the Directorship of António Coutinho, the IGC was restructured into last set-up and mode of action. Jonathan Howard succeeded Coutinho as Director of the IGC from October 2012 until January 2018. Since 1 February 2018, Mónica Bettencourt-Dias was the Director of the Instituto Gulbenkian de Ciência.

IGC was member of EU-LIFE, an alliance of leading life sciences research centres in Europe.

== History ==
The establishment of the IGC was initiated in 1961 when the Calouste Gulbenkian Foundation's board of trustees envisioned the creation of its own research centre to encourage multidisciplinary research, independent of universities, and without restrictions or prior interests. The original set up of the IGC included a Centre for Scientific Calculation (1962-1985), a Centre for Biology (1962), a centre for Pedagogical Innovation (1962-1980), a Centre for Agricultural Economy (1958-1986) and a Centre for Economy and Finances. A new building alongside the Marquês de Pombal Palace, in Oeiras, was projected to make up the new campus planned with a set of infrastructures including laboratories, library, canteen and animal facility. In 1967, the Centre for Biology was officially inaugurated at the new Oeiras campus with four research groups in Cell Biology, Pharmacology, Microbiology and Physiology and around 20 researchers. From 1966 to 1969, four IGC leaders passed away: Delfim Santos (Pedagogical Innovation), António Gião (Scientific Calculation), Flávio Resende (Biology) and Luís Quartin Graça (Agricultural Economy).

In 1968 Luís Archer, jesuit priest and biologist, widely regarded as the 'father' of molecular genetics in Portugal, returned to Portugal to set up the Molecular Genetics Laboratory at the IGC, in the Department of Cell Biology. The year after, in 1969, it was set up the Estudos Avançados de Oeiras (Oeiras Advanced Studies) to provide workshops, summer schools and international seminars to scientists.

In 1984, the Calouste Gulbenkian Foundation's Board of Trustees decided that IGC will be a research centre exclusively dedicated to research and post-graduate training in biology.

In 1989, the Instituto de Tecnologia Química e Biológica (ITQB) and the Instituto de Biologia Experimental e Tecnológica (iBET) were created and hosted in the IGC campus. With IGC, they will later form the Oeiras Campus.

António Coutinho, immunologist and Head of the Immunobiology Unit in Institut Pasteur, was appointed the Director of the Oeiras Advanced Studies in 1991. In 1993 Coutinho started the Gulbenkian PhD Programme in Biology and Medicine (PGDBM), a pioneering programme in Portugal and one of the first of this kind in the world. In 1998, Coutinho was designated Director of the IGC and started a new phase of the institute as a 'host institution' with the mission of identifying, educating and incubating new research leaders, providing access to facilities, and financial and intellectual autonomy to pursue research projects.

The Champalimaud Neuroscience Programme at the IGC was established in 2006 and the research groups of the newly formed Champalimaud Foundation were hosted at the IGC to carry out research in systems neuroscience until 2011, when they moved to the Champalimaud Foundation's new building in Lisbon.

In 2008, the IGC participated for the first time in the music festival NOS Alive under a partnership established between "Everything is New", promoter of NOS Alive, and the IGC to support fellowships for young researchers.

In 2010 and 2011, the IGC was ranked amongst the '10 Best Places for Post-docs' outside the US, by The Scientist Magazine.

Jonathan Howard, immunologist and Professor of Genetics at the University of Cologne, was appointed Director of the IGC in 2012, succeeding António Coutinho. Since February 2018, Mónica Bettencourt Dias is the new Director of the IGC.

== Research ==
=== Main Accomplishments ===
- A study published in Nature Cell Biology in July 2018, coordinated by Mónica Bettencourt-Dias, helped to better understand diseases that involve cells antennae, called ciliopathies. The researchers found that while cells use the same building materials for their antennae, they use them in different proportions and moments, thus creating the structurally different functions. This explains how their mutations, which occur in genetic diseases associated with cilia (e.g. diseases leading to infertility, loss of vision, obesity), usually affect only some antennae, not all of them, and some patients show all of the symptoms, while others may have only one type of defect.
- The research team led by Joana Gonçalves-Sá and Luís Rocha showed that there is a specific mood associated with religious celebrations, a "loving mood" that can influence human reproductive behaviour. Using worldwide data from Twitter and Google Trends they found that culture, and not only biology, drives human reproductive cycles. The study was published in Scientific Reports in December 2017.
- Ana Domingos and her group devoted to the study of the biological causes underlying obesity published a breakthrough study in Nature Medicine in October 2017. They discovered an unforeseen population of immune cells (macrophages) associated with sympathetic neurons in adipose tissue. These specialised macrophages are in direct contact with neurons and affect neuronal activation that is critical for fat mass reduction.
- For many years biologists have wondered why plants have so many genes coding for proteins that are known to be essential for the nervous system of animals, called glutamate receptors. A team led by José Feijó discovered a new function of these proteins, showing that moss sperm uses them to navigate towards the female organs and ensure offspring. The study was published in Nature in July 2017.
- Using experimental models of sepsis in mice, a research team led by Miguel Soares discovered an unsuspected mechanism that is protective against sepsis. The study was published in the scientific journal Cell in June 2017 and provided new avenues for therapeutic approaches against sepsis.
- Moisés Mallo and his research group have discovered the key factor that regulates trunk development in vertebrates and explains why snakes have such a strikingly different body. These findings published in Developmental Cell in August 2016, contributed to understand the origin of the exceptionally long trunks that characterise the body of snakes and may open new avenues to the study of spinal cord regeneration.
- A research team led by Mónica Bettencourt Dias shed light upon the critical mechanism of how oocytes, the maternal gametes, lose centrioles and the importance of doing so for female fertility. The results published in the scientific journal Science in May 2016 showed that centrioles normally have a coating that protects them which is lost inside the oocyte, eliminating therefore the centrioles. They further show that if the centrioles are not eliminated, those mothers are sterile.
- IGC scientists led by Miguel Godinho Ferreira found that certain organs, such as the gut, start to age before other tissues because its cells have a "timekeeper" with a faster pace. The results published in the journal PLoS Genetics in January 2016 also showed that monitoring the pace of these timekeepers can be a good indicator for the aging of the whole organism since the appearance of local age-related lesions anticipates the onset of age-associated diseases, such as cancer.
- Research led by Raquel Oliveira, has elucidated how cells are almost blind to chromosome cohesion defects. The results published in Cell Reports in October 2015 uncovered how these defects, often associated with cancer development, congenital diseases and infertility, evade the strict surveillance of the checkpoint mechanisms that ensure faithful genome segregation.
- Ana Domingos and her group have shown that fat tissue is innervated and that direct stimulation of neurons in fat is sufficient to induce fat breakdown. These results published in September 2015 in the journal Cell, set up the stage for developing novel anti-obesity therapies.
- Studies on the bacteria Wolbachia conducted by Luis Teixeira and his research group revealed that a single genomic change can turn beneficial bacteria into pathogenic bacteria, by boosting bacterial density inside the host. Wolbachia is a bacterium commonly present in insect species that can protect their hosts against viruses, including the dengue fever virus. These findings were published in the journal PLoS Biology in February 2015, in the first study linking genes and their functions in the Wolbachia bacterium and providing a starting point for the understanding of the widespread insect-Wolbachia symbiosis.
- In a study published in the scientific journal Cell in December 2014, a research team at IGC led by Miguel Soares discovered that specific bacterial components in the human gut microbiota can trigger a natural defence mechanism that is highly protective against malaria transmission.
- Three research groups at IGC led by Jocelyne Demengeot, Karina Xavier and Isabel Gordo joint efforts to unveil how the bacteria Escherichia coli (E. coli), one of the first species to colonize the human gut at birth, adapts and evolves in the mouse intestine. The study published in PLoS Genetics in March 2014, showed that E. coli with different advantageous mutations rapidly emerge and, consequently, a large genetic variation in this species is generated over time demonstrating how rich the evolutionary dynamics of each bacteria is in a healthy animal.
- The research team led by Henrique Teotónio in collaboration with Isabel Gordo, both from the IGC, has experimentally tested the Haldane's theory for the first time. The study was published in Nature Communications in September 2013 and confirmed this theory for the introduction of a new beneficial allele in a population. The study contributes to a better comprehension of how a population can evolve, with implications for studies on how species adapt to changing environments or species conservation.
- In August 2013, the research team led by Miguel Godinho Ferreira in collaboration with Isabel Gordo, showed for the first time that chromosomes rearrangements (such as inversions or translocations) can provide advantages to the cells that harbor them depending on the environment they are exposed. The study published in Nature Communications contributes to better understand different biological problems such as: how cancer cells that have chromosomal rearrangements can outgrow normal cells or how organisms may evolve in the same physical location to form distinct species.
- The researcher Miguel Soares co-authored a review in Science, in February 2012, on a largely overlooked strategy for treating infectious diseases. The immune system protects from infections by detecting and eliminating invading pathogens. The authors purposed a third strategy considering tolerance to infection, whereby the infected host protects itself from infection by reducing tissue damage and other negative effects caused by the pathogen or the immune response against the invader.
- In December 2011 the study published in Developmental Cell by Lar Jansen and his team uncovered a very simple, neat mechanism whereby the cell couples DNA duplication, cell division and centromere assembly. By using the same machinery for all these steps but in opposite ways, the cells confirm that the right number of copies of both genes and centromeres are made by allowing each the appropriate time.
- The IGC has been part of the multinational team of researchers from 10 countries that sequenced the genome of the tiny spider mite in a study published in Nature, in November 2011. The sequence of the spider mite genome has revealed the genetic basis for its feeding flexibility and pesticide resistance.
- A team led by Florence Janody have uncovered a surprising link between the cell's skeleton and organ size. It was shown in a study published in Development, in April 2011, that one of the proteins that regulates the skeleton of the cell also acts to blocks activation of genes that promote cell survival and proliferation. These findings add to the puzzle of understanding how proliferation genes are abnormally activated, often leading to tumours.
- A research team led by Miguel Soares discovered how sickle cell anemia protects against malaria and published the study in the journal Cell, in April 2011.
- An international team led by José Feijó published a study in Science, in March 2011, revealing that pollen, the organ that contains the plant male gametes, communicate with the pistil, their female counterpart, using a mechanism commonly observed in the nervous system of animals. The study showed a new mechanism which underlies reproduction in plants and how cell-cell communication is conserved between animals and plants.
- A research team led by Miguel Soares found that free heme, released from red blood cells during infection, is the cause of organ failure, leading to the lethal outcome of severe sepsis. Moreover, the team found that the toxic effect of free heme can be overcome by hemopexin, a naturally occurring molecule that neutralises free heme. These findings were published in the Science Translational Medicine journal in September 2010.
- A study published in Nature, in September 2010, by a team of researchers led by Miguel Godinho Ferreira solved a paradox related to telomeres, the protective tips of chromosomes. The broken chromosome ends generated by DNA damage are quickly joined. However, telomeres are never tied to each other, thus allowing for the correct segregation of the genetic material into all cells. The researchers found that one of the histones neighbouring the telomeres lacks a chemical signal, thus rendering the DNA damage recognition machinery incapable of arresting the cell cycle.

== PhD programmes ==
The IGC started the postgraduate training with the format of a PhD programme in 1993 with the Gulbenkian PhD Programme in Biology and Medicine (PGDBM) followed by the Gulbenkian PhD Programme in Biomedicine (PGDB). In 2013, 20 years after the first structured PhD programme in Portugal, the Fundação para a Ciência e a Tecnologia (FCT) started supporting the PhD Programme in Integrative Biomedical Sciences (PDIGC - PIBS) that was the last program under the direction of Jorge Carneiro.

== Science outreach ==
Open days, researchers' nights, school outreach and informal education programmes reach hundreds of students, teachers and the public every year.

== Infrastructure ==
Facilities include bio-computing services, animal SPF (Specific Pathogen Free) facilities including a "germ-free" unit, transgenics unit, plant facility, high-speed cell sorting, electron and advanced microscopy, next generation sequencing, monoclonal antibody preparation and histopathology. Other services include a library, a dedicated in-house data center and IT team, as well as a research funding office and project management team.

== Merger with IMM ==
On October 1, 2024 IGC merged with the Institute of Molecular Medicine of the University of Lisbon. Now IGC and IMM exist as single institute under the name of Gulbenkian Institute of Molecular Medicine (GIMM).
