= Global Partnership Against the Spread of Weapons and Materials of Mass Destruction =

International security initiative

- Global Partnership logo
- Formation: 27 June 2002
- Type: Multilateral Group, G7-led
- Purpose: Preventing the proliferation of chemical, biological, radiological, and nuclear (CBRN) weapons and related materials
- Fields: Biological Security; Chemical Weapons; UNSCR 1540 Implementation; Nuclear & Radiological Security
- Members: 31 active members: Australia, Belgium, Canada, Czech Republic, Denmark, European Union, Finland, France, Georgia, Germany, Hungary, Ireland, Italy, Japan, Jordan, Kazakhstan, Republic of Korea, Mexico, Netherlands, New Zealand, Norway, Philippines, Poland, Portugal, Spain, Sweden, Switzerland, Ukraine, United Kingdom, United States
- Website: www.gpwmd.com

The G7-led Global Partnership Against the Spread of Weapons and Materials of Mass Destruction (Global Partnership) is an international security initiative announced at the 2002 G8 summit in Kananaskis, Canada, in response to the September 11 attacks. It is the primary multilateral group that coordinates funding and in-kind support to help vulnerable countries around the world combat the spread of weapons and materials of mass destruction (WMDs).

The Global Partnership began as a 10-year, US$20 billion initiative aimed at addressing the threat of WMD proliferation to non-state actors and states of proliferation concern. The initial focus was on programming in Russia and other countries of the Former Soviet Union (FSU) to mitigate serious threats posed by Soviet-era WMD legacies. Specific priorities included: destroying stockpiles of chemical weapons, dismantling decommissioned nuclear submarines, safeguarding/disposing of fissile material, and the redirection of former weapons scientists. In recognition of the Global Partnership’s success and the increasingly global nature of WMD proliferation and terrorism challenges, at the 2008 G8 Summit in Toyako, Japan, leaders agreed to expand the geographic focus of the Global Partnership beyond Russia and the FSU, and to target WMD proliferation threats wherever they presented. Additionally, at the 2011 G8 Summit in Deauville, France, G8 leaders extended the mandate of the Global Partnership beyond its original 10-year timeline (based on work undertaken by Canada during its 2010 G8 Presidency).

To date the Global Partnership community has delivered more than US$25 billion in tangible threat-reduction programming and continues to lead international efforts to mitigate all manner of CBRN threats around the world. As outlined in the Global Partnership’s annual Programming Annex, in 2020 a total of 245 Projects valued at US$669 million (or €555 million) were implemented by Members in dozens of countries in every region of the world. Many additional contributions were measured not by financial means, but by the leadership and diplomatic efforts of members in the areas of threat reduction or non-proliferation.

== Priorities and working groups ==
The Global Partnership delivers threat reduction programming in four priority areas: nuclear and radiological security, biological security, chemical security, and implementation of the United Nations Security Council Resolution (UNSCR) 1540.

Members of the Global Partnership coordinate and collaborate on an ongoing basis to develop and deliver projects and programs to mitigate all manner of threats posed by chemical, biological, radiological and nuclear (CBRN) weapons and related materials. Under the leadership of the rotational G7 Presidency, Global Partnership partners come together twice annually as the Global Partnership Working Group (GPWG) to review progress, assess the threat landscape and discuss where and how members can meaningfully engage to prevent terrorists and states of proliferation concern from acquiring and using weapons of mass destruction.

There are four sub-working groups subsumed under the GPWG. They aim to facilitate regular dialogue between experts on the Global Partnership's thematic priorities:

- Biological Security Working Group (BSWG)
- Chemical Security Working Group (CSWG)
- CBRN Working Group (CBRNWG)
- Nuclear & Radiological Security Working Group (NRWSG)

== Member countries and partners ==
Although originally launched as a G8 initiative and retaining strong affiliation with the G7 (e.g. the Global Partnership Presidency rotates with that of the G7), the Global Partnership currently includes 30 active member countries and the European Union. Russia does not currently participate, consistent with G7 exclusion.

The Global Partnership coordinates and collaborates with a variety of international organizations, initiatives and non-governmental organizations (NGOs) with similarly aligned objectives. Some of these key partners include the International Atomic Energy Agency (IAEA), the International Police Organization (INTERPOL), the Organisation for the Prohibition of Chemical Weapons (OPCW), the United Nations Security Council Resolution 1540 Committee, the World Health Organization, and other United Nations Agencies.

== See also ==
- Arms control
- Disarmament
- Weapons of Mass Destruction
