= Network of European Foundations for Innovative Cooperation =

Belgian-based nonprofit organization

The Network of European Foundations for Innovative Cooperation (NEF) is an international non-profit organization, with headquarters in Brussels (Belgium). The organization was created in order to strengthen cooperation between European foundations.

== Members ==
The foundation has 13 members including:

- Bank of Sweden Tercentenary Foundation
- Bernard van Leer Foundation
- Calouste Gulbenkian Foundation
- Charities Aid Foundation
- Charles Stewart Mott Foundation
- Compagnia di San Paolo
- ERSTE Foundation
- European Cultural Foundation
- Fondation de France
- Joseph Rowntree Charitable Trust
- La Foundation Gabriel
- Robert Bosch Stiftung
