= Tetrahydropalmatine =

Isoquinoline alkaloid, found mainly in Corydalis

Clinical data
- Other names: rotundine, hyndanrine

Identifiers
- IUPAC name: (13aS)-2,3,9,10-tetramethoxy-6,8,13,13a-tetrahydro-5H-isoquinolino[2,1-b]isoquinoline
- CAS Number: 483-14-7
- PubChem CID: 72301
- DrugBank: DB12093
- ChemSpider: 65252
- UNII: 3X69CO5I79
- KEGG: C02890
- ChEBI: CHEBI:16563
- ChEMBL: ChEMBL487182
- CompTox Dashboard (EPA): DTXSID701020650
- ECHA InfoCard: 100.241.370

Chemical and physical data
- Formula: C_{21}H_{25}NO_{4}
- Molar mass: 355.434 g·mol^{−1}
- 3D model (JSmol): Interactive image
- SMILES: O(c1c4c(ccc1OC)C[C@H]3c2c(cc(OC)c(OC)c2)CCN3C4)C
- InChI: InChI=1S/C21H25NO4/c1-23-18-6-5-13-9-17-15-11-20(25-3)19(24-2)10-14(15)7-8-22(17)12-16(13)21(18)26-4/h5-6,10-11,17H,7-9,12H2,1-4H3/t17-/m0/s1; Key:AEQDJSLRWYMAQI-KRWDZBQOSA-N

Tetrahydropalmatine (THP) is an isoquinoline alkaloid found in several different plant species, mainly in the genus Corydalis (Yan Hu Suo), but also in other plants such as Stephania rotunda. These plants have traditional uses in Chinese herbal medicine. The pharmaceutical industry has synthetically produced the more potent enantiomer Levo-tetrahydropalmatine (Levo-THP; technically l-THP, often written L-THP), which has been marketed worldwide under different brand names as an alternative to anxiolytic and sedative drugs of the benzodiazepine group and analgesics such as opiates. It is also sold as a dietary supplement.

In 1940, a Vietnamese scientist Sang Dinh Bui extracted an alkaloid from the root of Stephania rotunda with the yield of 1.2–1.5% and he named this compound rotundin. From 1950 to 1952, two Indian scientists studied and extracted from Stephania glabra another alkaloid named hyndanrine. In 1965, the structure of rotundine and hyndarin was proved to be the same as tetrahydropalmatine.

== Effects ==
Tetrahydropalmatine has been demonstrated to possess analgesic effects and may be beneficial in the treatment of heart disease and liver damage. It is a blocker of voltage-activated L-type calcium channel active potassium channels. It is a potent muscle relaxant. It is widely used in China as a sedative.

It has also shown potential in the treatment of drug addiction to both cocaine and opiates, and preliminary human studies have shown promising results. In animal models, anti-addiction effects can manifest at sub-sedative doses.

== Adverse effects ==
In November 2013, the Chinese National Medical Products Administration issued an order asking for all medications containing l-THP to have their package inserts revised, prohibiting use in pregnant women and those with extrapyramidal disorders, requiring warnings about liver impairement and operation of machinery, and highlighting risks of drowsiness and extrapyramidal symptoms with overuse or when combined with other CNS depressants. Long-term is not advised. The same order lists the following OTC medications as containing l-THP:

Chinese-approved OTC medications containing l-THP
Native name	Translated name	Composition	Indication / Purpose	Package Insert Ref
复方枣仁胶囊	Compound date seed capsule	Sour-date seeds, l-THP 60 mg	Insomnia.	
罗通定片	Rotundine tablet	Rotundine 30 mg	Analgesia, sedative-hypnotic.	
盐酸罗通定片	Rotundine HCl tablet	Rotundine HCl 30 mg	Analgesia, sedative-hypnotic.	
复方维生素U胶囊	Compound vitamin U capsule	Al(OH)_{3} 90 mg, Mg_{2}Si_{3}O_{8} 72.5 mg, "vitamin U" 25 mg, licorice extract powder 16.5 mg, rotundine 2 mg, Bletilla striata 17 mg, amylase 25 mg, bile powder 1.5 mg, menthol 0.5 mg	Chronic gastritis, hyperacidity (pain, heartburn, GERD)	

== Mechanism of action ==
The pharmacological profile of l-THP includes antagonism of dopamine D_{1}, and D_{2} receptors as well as actions at dopamine D_{3}, alpha adrenergic and serotonin receptors. The Ki values for l-THP at D_{1} and D_{2} dopamine receptors are approximately 124 nM (D_{1}) and 388 nM (D_{2}). In addition to the antagonism of postsynaptic dopamine receptors, the blockade of presynaptic autoreceptors by l-THP results in increased dopamine release, and it has been suggested that lower affinity of l-THP for D_{2} receptors may confer some degree of autoreceptor selectivity. Along with dopamine receptors, l-THP has been reported to interact with a number of other receptor types, including alpha-1 adrenergic receptors, at which it functions as an antagonist, and GABA_{A} receptors, through positive allosteric modulation. Additionally, l-THP displays significant binding to 5-HT_{1A} and alpha-2 adrenergic receptors. In the case of 5-HT_{1A} receptors, l-THP binds with a Ki of approximately 340 nM.

Receptor binding by l-THP
Target	Organism	Type	Affinity (nM)
F3	Human	IC50	23
RT	HIV-1	IC50	562000
D_{1/1A}	Human	IC50	1630; 166±8
D_{1/1A}	Human	Ki	231; 124±6
D_{2}	Human	IC50	450; 1470±270
D_{2}	Human	Ki	1130 >5000; 388±78
D_{3}	Human	IC50	3250±540
D_{3}	Human	Ki	1370; 1420±220
D_{4}	Human	Ki	>1000
D_{5/1B}	Human	Ki	305
5-HT_{1A}	Human	IC50	374±69
5-HT_{1A}	Human	Ki	>5000; 340±63
α1	Human	(> 50% inhibition non-selective binding @ 10 μM)	
α2	Human	(> 50% inhibition binding @ 10 μM)6	

Animal experiments have shown that the sedative effect of THP results from blocking dopaminergic neurons in the brain. Dopamine is an important neurotransmitter in the central nervous system where it occurs in several important signaling systems that regulate muscular activity and attention, as well as feelings of joy, enthusiasm, and creativity. THP causes no feelings of euphoria, and has been seen as an alternative to addictive drugs for people suffering from anxiety and pain, and as a possibility for relief for people not helped by existing drugs.

Induction of ΔfosB by antipsychotics in the prefrontal cortex — which may extend to the D2 receptor antagonism of l-THP — has been associated with negative behavioural outcomes. Chronic blockade of dopaminergic receptors has been associated with weight gain, apathy, metabolic syndrome, extrapyramidal symptoms, tardive dyskinesia which can be permanent, neuroleptic malignant syndrome, reduced cognitive function, reduced brain matter volume and increased ventricular or fluid volume.

== Biosynthesis ==
The biosynthesis of tetrahydropalmatine starts with tyrosine and proceeds via (S)-reticuline in a pathway leading to benzylisoquinoline alkaloids. The final step is a methylation reaction by the enzyme tetrahydrocolumbamine 2-O-methyltransferase using the cofactor, S-adenosyl methionine (SAM). This transfers a methyl group, giving S-adenosyl-L-homocysteine (SAH) as a by-product.

(S)-isocorypalmine
+ SAM
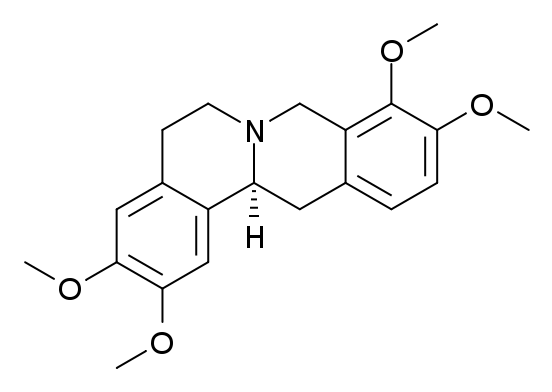
tetrahydropalmatine
+ SAH

Tetrahydropalmatine can be metabolised by the enzyme tetrahydroberberine oxidase, which oxidises it to palmatine:

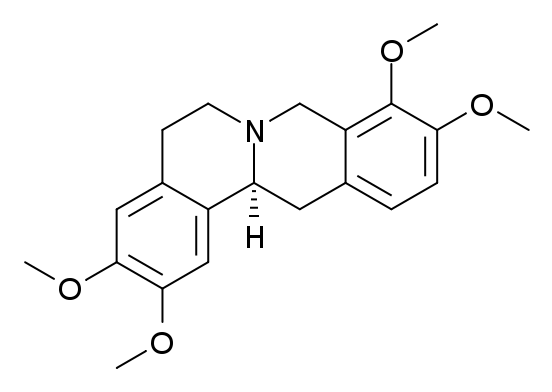
tetrahydropalmatine
+ H^{+}
2 O_{2}
2 H_{2}O_{2}
palmatine

== Safety ==
L-THP has a pharmacokinetic profile that is favorable for clinical use. L-THP has a long-standing record of safe use in China for a number of indications under the trade-name Rotundine. Concerns about liver toxicity and sedation associated with the use of some l-THP containing herbal preparations in the US are likely due to poor quality and improper use of these unregulated products.

== Research ==
The University of Maryland has completed a phase I study for THP in people with a history of cocaine use. Their phase II study for cocaine use disorder was withdrawn due to a lack of funding.

l-THP does not improve psychiatric symptoms when added on top of antipsychotics in schizophrenia.

== See also ==
- Apomorphine
- Bulbocapnine
- Glaucine
- Nantenine
- Nuciferine
- Pukateine
- Stepholidine
