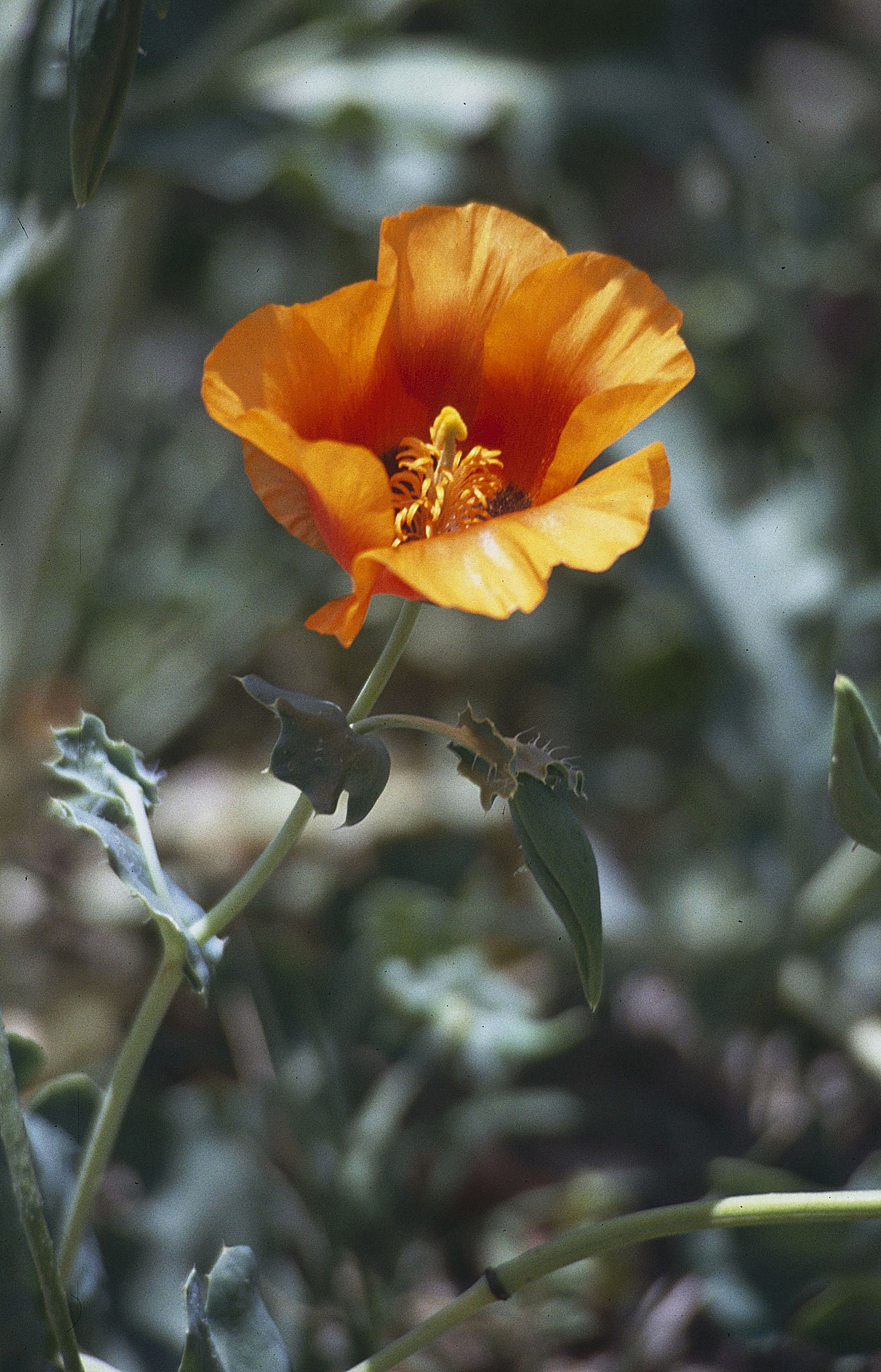

Scientific classification
- Kingdom: Plantae
- Clade: Tracheophytes
- Clade: Angiosperms
- Clade: Eudicots
- Order: Ranunculales
- Family: Papaveraceae
- Genus: Glaucium
- Species: G. grandiflorum

Binomial name
- Glaucium grandiflorum Boiss. & A.Huet

Synonyms
- Glaucium judaicum Bornm.

= Glaucium grandiflorum =

Species of flowering plant

Glaucium grandiflorum, the great-flowered horned poppy, is a species of flowering plant in the horned poppy genus which is native to the Middle East.

== Description ==
The species is a perennial flowering plant which has scalloped, blue-gray leaves. It flowers in the summer and fall with orange-red flowers that are 4 centimetres (1.6 in) in diameter. These flowers are on long stems which extend above the plant's foliage. The seed pods ripen in late summer.

Glaucium grandiflorum grows 6–40 centimetres (2.4–15.7 in) and can have one or more main stems. These stems are branched, and are covered with rather dense hairs. The petals are 1–4.5 centimetres (0.39–1.77 in) long. There are numerous stamens with anthers 1–4 millimetres (0.039–0.157 in) in length. Their filaments are monotonic in the upper half and broadened in the lower half. The pedicels, when fruiting, can be up to 9 centimetres (3.5 in) long, and are erect or contorted and hairy. The stigmas are 4–9 millimetres (0.16–0.35 in) broad.

=== Phytochemistry ===
Numerous alkaloids have been isolated from the plant, including norchelidonine, dihydrochelerythrine, 8-acetonyldihydrochelerythrine, protopine, allocryptopine, corypalmine, and tetrahydropalmatine.

== Taxonomy ==
Glaucium grandiflorum has two accepted infraspecific varieties:

- Glaucium grandiflorum var. haussknechtii (Bornm. & Fedde) A. Parsa
- Glaucium grandiflorum var. iranicum B. Mory

== Distribution and habitat ==
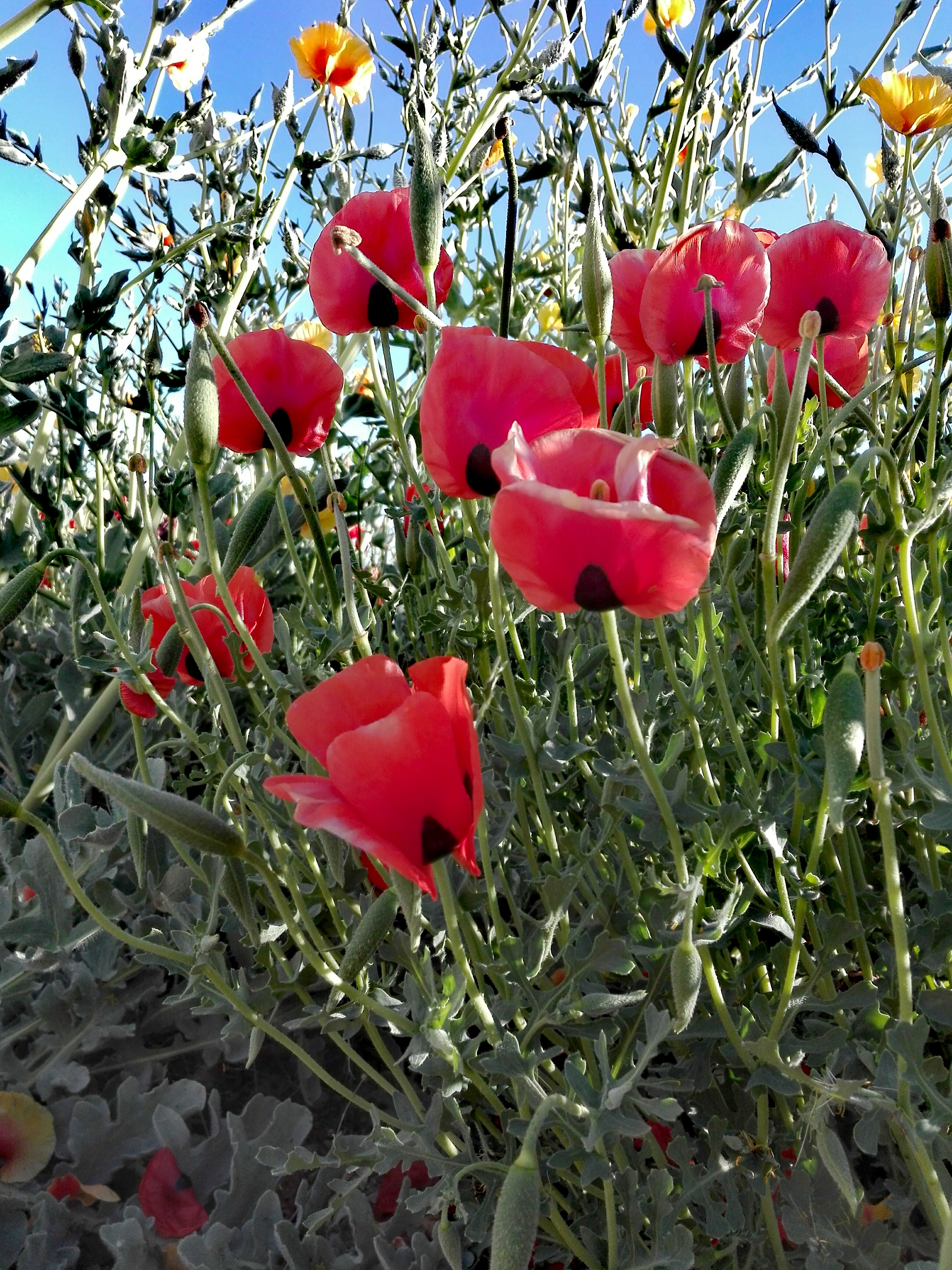
Glaucium grandiflorum in Iran

Glaucium grandiflorum has a distribution from the Eastern Mediterranean to Iran.

Glaucium grandiflorum is found in disturbed habitats and shrub-steppes. It is found in the Irano-Turanian floristic region and is a glycophyte.

== Gallery ==
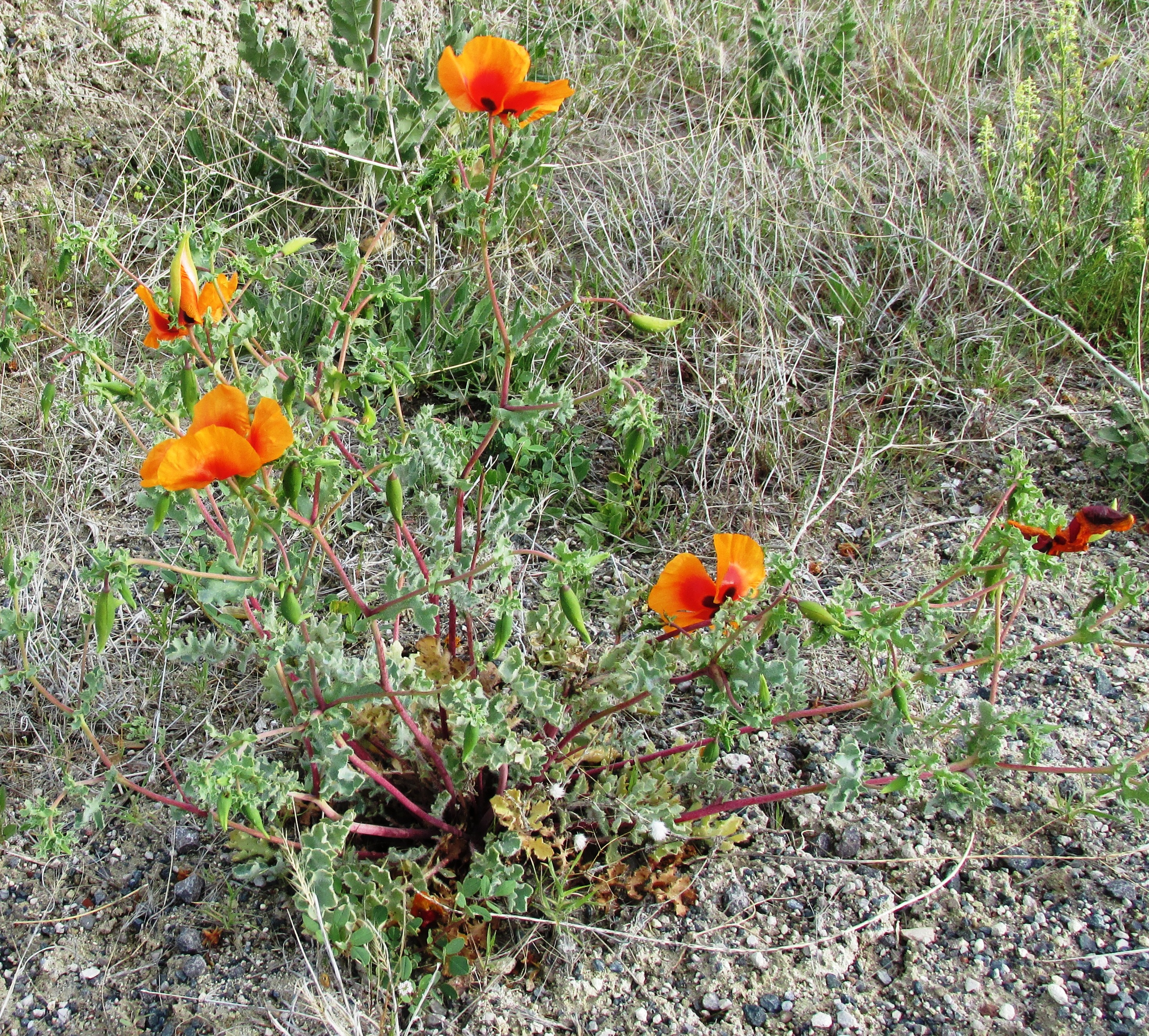

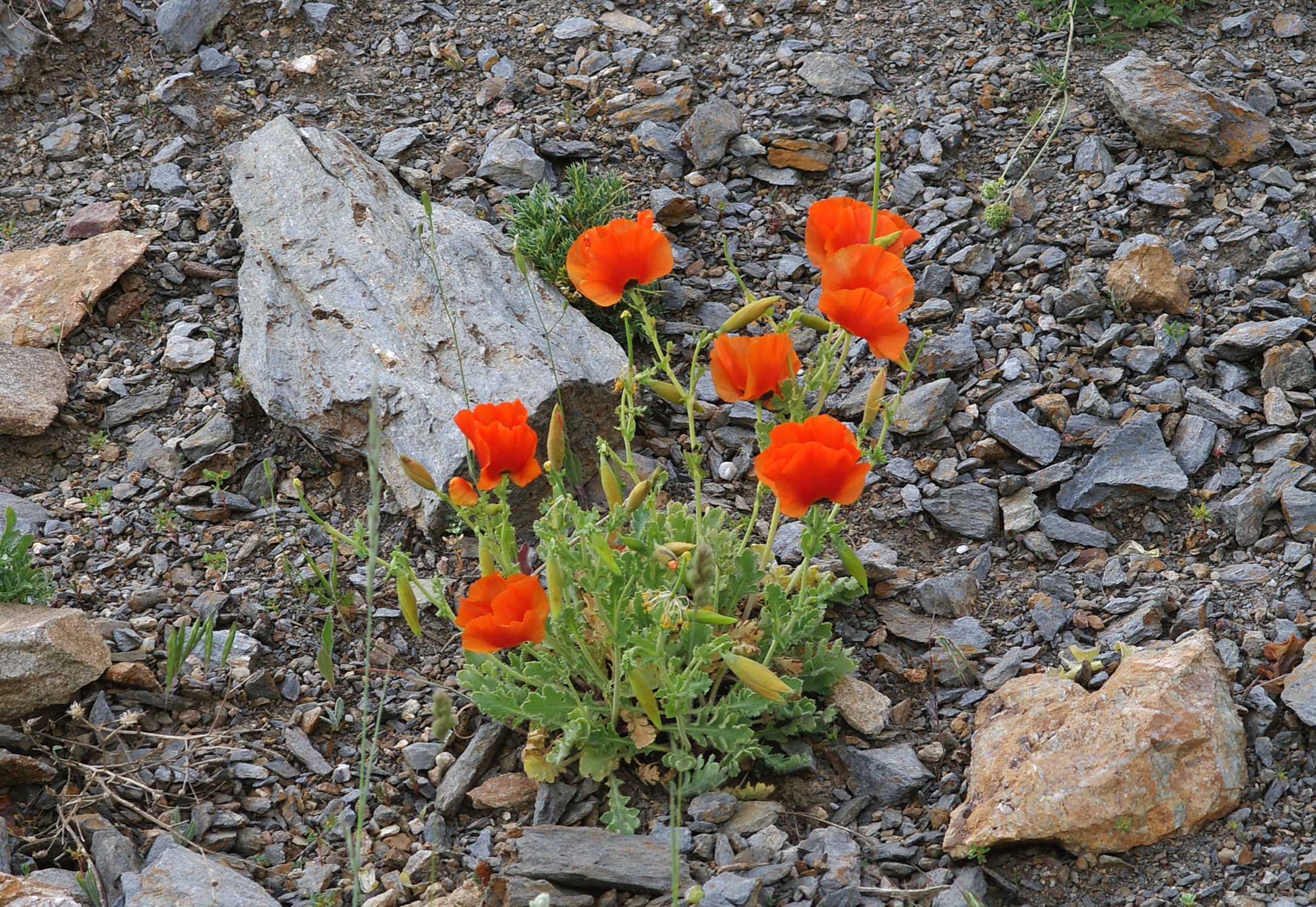

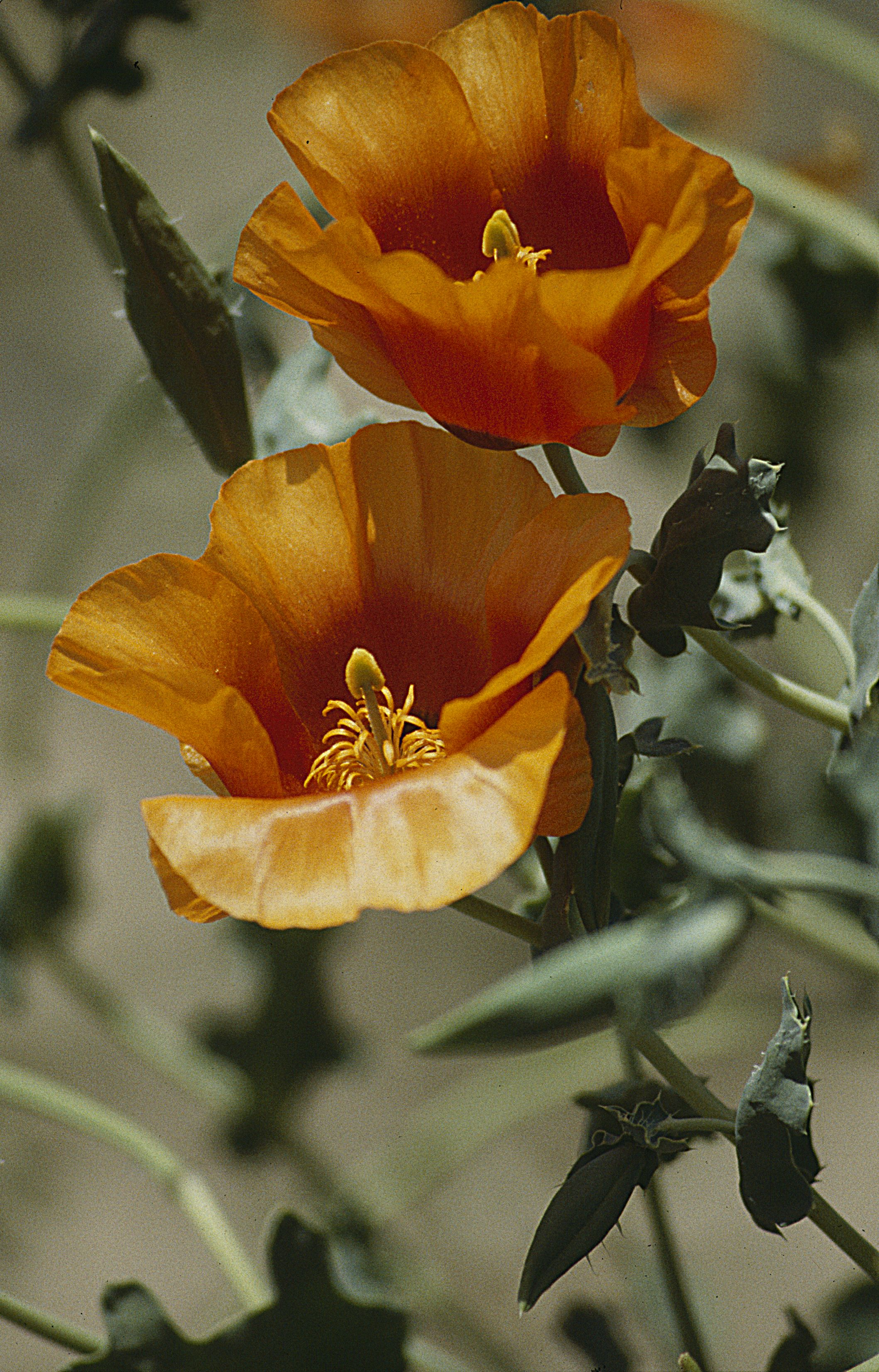

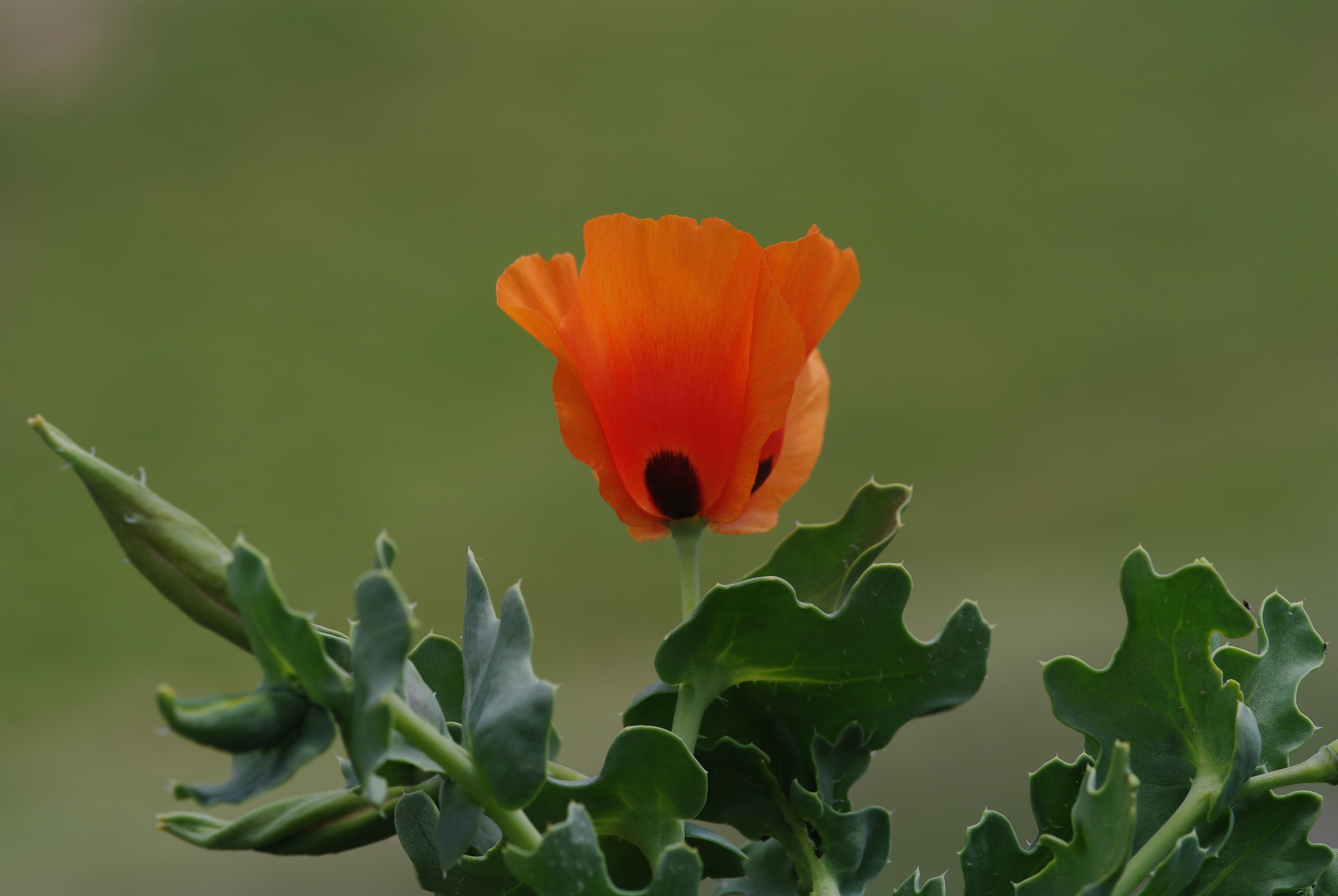

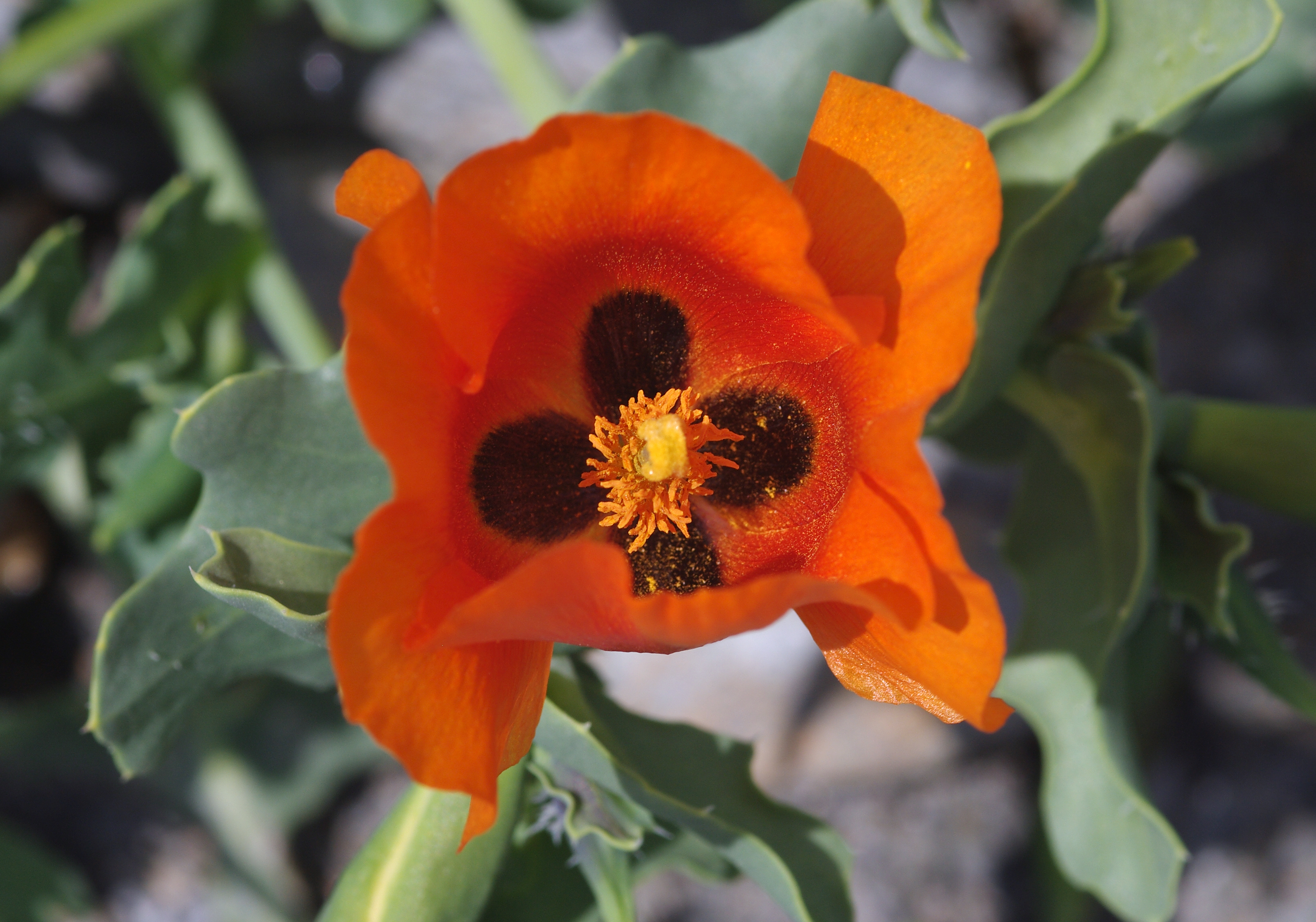
