= Nuciferine =

Clinical data
- Other names: 1,2-Dimethoxy-6aβ-aporphine; (R)-1,2-Dimethoxyaporphine
- Routes of administration: Oral
- Drug class: Non-selective monoamine receptor modulator; Antipsychotic
- ATC code: None

Identifiers
- IUPAC name: (6aR)-1,2-dimethoxy-6-methyl-5,6,6a,7-tetrahydro-4H-dibenzo[de,g]quinoline
- CAS Number: 475-83-2
- PubChem CID: 10146
- ChemSpider: 9740
- UNII: W26UEB90B7
- ChEMBL: ChEMBL464529
- CompTox Dashboard (EPA): DTXSID40963862

Chemical and physical data
- Formula: C_{19}H_{21}NO_{2}
- Molar mass: 295.382 g·mol^{−1}
- 3D model (JSmol): Interactive image
- SMILES: CN(CC1)[C@]2([H])CC3=CC=CC=C3C4=C2C1=CC(OC)=C4OC
- InChI: InChI=1S/C19H21NO2/c1-20-9-8-13-11-16(21-2)19(22-3)18-14-7-5-4-6-12(14)10-15(20)17(13)18/h4-7,11,15H,8-10H2,1-3H3/t15-/m1/s1; Key:ORJVQPIHKOARKV-OAHLLOKOSA-N

Nuciferine is an alkaloid found within the plants Nymphaea caerulea (blue lotus or blue water lilly) and Nelumbo nucifera (sacred lotus or pink lotus). It interacts with various serotonin and dopamine receptors, acting as an antagonist of some receptors and as an agonist of others, and additionally acts as a dopamine reuptake inhibitor, among other actions.

== Pharmacology ==
A 1978 study found that nuciferine acts as a dopamine receptor blocker producing neuroleptic effects, whereas its Hofmann elimination product atherosperminine stimulates dopamine receptors, producing opposing psychopharmacological effects.

According to a 2016 characterization study, nuciferine acts as a relatively potent antagonist at 5-HT_{2C} receptors, an inverse agonist at 5-HT_{7} receptors, and a moderate-to-high-efficacy partial agonist at D_{2} receptors (E_{max} = 67%). It also acts as an antagonist at 5-HT_{2A} and 5-HT_{2B} receptors (exhibiting high binding affinity but low functional potency at 5-HT_{2B}), a low-potency partial agonist at 5-HT_{6} and D_{5} receptors, and a functionally weak agonist at 5-HT_{1A} and D_{4} receptors. Additionally, it inhibits the dopamine transporter (DAT), acting as a dopamine reuptake inhibitor.

In rodent models relating to antipsychotic drug effects, nuciferine has shown various antipsychotic-like actions such as blocking head-twitch response and discriminative stimulus effects of a 5-HT_{2A} receptor agonist, enhancing amphetamine-induced hyperlocomotion, inhibiting phencyclidine (PCP)-induced hyperlocomotion, and restoring PCP-induced disruption of pre-pulse inhibition without inducing catalepsy.

Nuciferine may also potentiate morphine analgesia. The median lethal dose in mice is 289 mg/kg. It is structurally related to apomorphine and other aporphine derivatives.

Nuciferine has been reported to have various anti-inflammatory effects, possibly mediated via PPAR delta activation.

== See also ==
- Aporphine alkaloid
- Apomorphine
- Bulbocapnine
- Glaucine
- Nantenine
- Pukateine
- Stepholidine
- Tetrahydropalmatine
