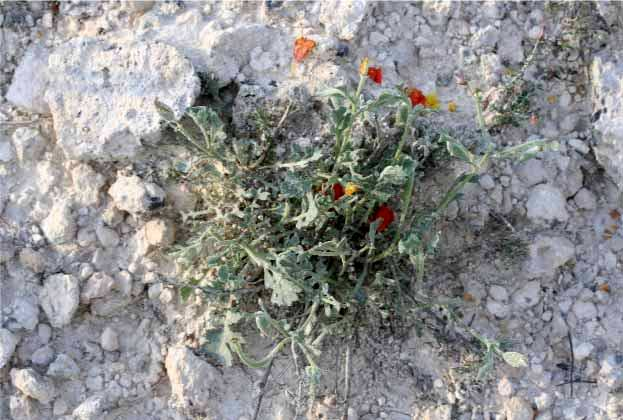

Scientific classification
- Kingdom: Plantae
- Clade: Embryophytes
- Clade: Tracheophytes
- Clade: Spermatophytes
- Clade: Angiosperms
- Clade: Eudicots
- Order: Ranunculales
- Family: Papaveraceae
- Genus: Glaucium
- Species: G. secmenii

Binomial name
- Glaucium secmenii Yild.

= Glaucium secmenii =

Species of flowering plant

Glaucium secmenii is a species of flowering plant in the horned poppy genus which is endemic to Turkey.

== Description ==
Glaucium secmenii is a perennial plant which grows in small dense cushions. Its taproot is woody and is short and thick. It is surrounded by old hardened petioles at its base. The stems of the plant are 8–10 centimetres (3.1–3.9 in) long and grow upright from many branches at the base. The leaves are 2.5 centimetres (0.98 in) by 0.5–1.8 centimetres (0.20–0.71 in) in size. They are arranged in a pinnate fashion on each side of the stem, but not down the whole length of the stem. The leaves are densely covered with long soft hairs, with a narrow and oblong shape and serrated edges.

Each flower is solitary and about 1.5 centimetres (0.59 in) in diameter, growing at the end of a short stalk which is curved. There are two sepals per flower which measure 1.1–1.5 centimetres (0.43–0.59 in) by 0.5–0.6 centimetres (0.20–0.24 in) in size. They are narrower at the tip and have their widest portion near their base, tapering to a point at their apex. They have fine, straight hairs of a silky texture. The petals measure 1.2–1.6 centimetres (0.47–0.63 in) by 1.6–1.7 centimetres (0.63–0.67 in) in size and are an orange-reddish color. There are numerous yellow stamens.

The pollen is sphere-shaped and has three colpus and microechinate bristle ornamentation. It measures 19–30 μm long by 20–34 μm wide. The colpus measure 13–25 μm long by 4–14 μm wide.

The seedpod is of a linear shape and has dense, fine hairs. The seed is oblong in shape and a blackish-brown color. Its surface is pitted with cavities which are separated by protruding partitions. The seed measures 0.98–1.74 millimetres (0.039–0.069 in) long by 0.83–1.66 millimetres (0.033–0.065 in) wide. The length of the seed's hilum is 0.62–1.34 millimetres (0.024–0.053 in) long.

=== Similar species ===
Glaucium secmenii is very similar in appearance to the related species Glaucium corniculatum, but can be told apart by a few key differences. First, G. secmenii is a perennial plant, whereas G. corniculatum is annual or biennial. Its stems are also significantly shorter, its flowers are smaller, and its petals are smaller. Finally, the hairs on its sepals are smoother and silkier, whereas the sepal hairs of G. corniculatum are more coarse and rough.

== Taxonomy ==
The type specimen of the species was collected by Şinasi Yıldırımlı on 6 January 2012. It was found between an elevation of 955–1,025 metres (3,133–3,363 ft) near the town of Sivrihisar in Eskişehir Province.

Glaucium secmenii was given its specific epithet in honor of Dr. Özcan Seçmen, a prominent Turkish botanist of the Ege University.

== Ecology ==
Glaucium secmenii is endemic to the Central Anatolia region of Turkey, and is found in the Anatolia-Turanian floral region.

The species can be found among gypsum, along creeks, and on hills and slopes. It flowers during the month of June.
