= C20H23NO2 =

The molecular formula C_{20}H_{23O}N_{2} (molar mass: 309.409 g/mol) may refer to:

- Dexoxadrol
- Atherosperminine
