= Nantenine =

Chemical compound

Clinical data
- ATC code: none

Identifiers
- IUPAC name: (S)-1,2-Dimethoxy-6-methyl-5,6,6a,7-tetrahydro-4H-benzo[de][1,3]benzodioxolo[5,6-g]quinoline
- CAS Number: 2565-01-7
- PubChem CID: 197001
- ChemSpider: 170619
- UNII: XE0AU8C122
- ChEMBL: ChEMBL467094
- CompTox Dashboard (EPA): DTXSID70180343

Chemical and physical data
- Formula: C_{20}H_{21}NO_{4}
- Molar mass: 339.391 g·mol^{−1}
- 3D model (JSmol): Interactive image
- SMILES: CN1CCC2=CC(=C(C3=C2[C@@H]1CC4=CC5=C(C=C43)OCO5)OC)OC
- InChI: InChI=1S/C20H21NO4/c1-21-5-4-11-7-17(22-2)20(23-3)19-13-9-16-15(24-10-25-16)8-12(13)6-14(21)18(11)19/h7-9,14H,4-6,10H2,1-3H3/t14-/m0/s1; Key:WSVWKHTVFGTTKJ-AWEZNQCLSA-N

Nantenine is an alkaloid found in the plant Nandina domestica as well as some Corydalis species. It is an antagonist of both the α_{1}-adrenergic receptor and the serotonin 5-HT_{2A} receptor, and blocks both the behavioral and physiological effects of MDMA in animals.

== See also ==
- Apomorphine
- Bulbocapnine
- Glaucine
- Nuciferine
- Pukateine
- Stepholidine
- Tetrahydropalmatine
