= Glaucium calycinum =

Scientific classification
- Kingdom: Plantae
- Clade: Tracheophytes
- Clade: Angiosperms
- Clade: Eudicots
- Order: Ranunculales
- Family: Papaveraceae
- Genus: Glaucium
- Species: G. calycinum

Binomial name
- Glaucium calycinum Boiss.

Species of flowering plant

Glaucium calycinum is a species of flowering plant in the horned poppy genus which is endemic to Iran.

== Description ==
Glaucium calycinum is a biennial flowering plant ranging from 18–40 centimetres (7.1–15.7 in) in height with a life cycle of roughly two years. It has branches, usually hairless, on its stems, though the lower parts of the stem may have a few sparse hairs. Its buds are 1.5–4 centimetres (0.59–1.57 in) long with sepals that might have hairs; these flower into petals 2–4.5 centimetres (0.79–1.77 in) long, the ends of which are yellow, transitioning to orange at the center. There are many stamens whose anthers are 2–3.5 millimetres (0.079–0.138 in) long, with filaments that are wider in the middle but narrow towards the end and the base. The seed pods are of the silique type and may or may not have hairs; if they do then these are scale-shaped while the plant is immature. Once the plant has matured these seed pods can grow up to 20 centimetres (7.9 in) long. When the plant is fruiting, its pedicels grow up to 10.5 centimetres (4.1 in) long and stand upright or slightly bent.

=== Similar species ===
Glaucium yazdianum has similar petal color and leaf shape to G. calycinum. However, their cellular structures, shape of trichomes on the siliquae, and bud length differ in several ways.

== Taxonomy ==
The species has two accepted subspecies:

- G. calycinum subsp. calycinum
- G. calycinum subsp. aserbaidshanicum Mory

== Distribution and habitat ==
Glaucium calycinum is only found in Iran, making it endemic to the country. Specifically, plants of the species have been recorded from the central, northern, and northwestern parts of Iran. The plant grows along roads and on hillsides, and the ground on which it is found is clay-rich or bare. The species is found at elevations of 280–2,000 metres (310–2,190 yd).
