= Özcan Seçmen =

Turkish botanist

- Born: 1947 (age 77–78)
- Education: Ege University
- Scientific career
- Fields: Botany
- Author abbrev. (botany): Seçmen

Özcan Seçmen (born 1 January 1947) is a Turkish botanist and former professor at Ege University. He specializes in Plant Ecology and Geography and is a member of the Turkish Biologists Association.

== Published taxa ==
The following are taxa published, in part, by Seçmen:

- Helichrysum unicapitatum Şenol, Seçmen & B.Öztürk
- Lythrum anatolicum Leblebici & Seçmen
- Prangos hulusii Şenol, Yıldırım & Seçmen

== Eponymous taxa ==
The following are taxa named in honor of Seçmen:

- Ekimia ozcan-secmenii
- Glaucium secmenii
- Hypericum sechmenii

== Selected publications ==
- Seçmen, Ö. & Leblebici, E. 1978. "Gökçeada ve Bozcaada adalarının vejetasyon ve florası." II. Florası. Bitki 5(3): 271–368. Reference page.
- Leblebici, E. & Seçmen, Ö. 1995. "A new species of Lythrum (Lythraceae) from the Western Black Sea Region of Turkey." Turkish Journal of Botany 19(5): 559–560. Reference page.
