= Pukateine =

Chemical compound

Clinical data
- Other names: (R)-11-hydroxy-1,2-methylenedioxyaporphine
- ATC code: none

Identifiers
- IUPAC name: (7aR)-7-methyl-6,7,7a,8-tetrahydro-5H-benzo[g][1,3]benzodioxolo[6,5,4-de]quinolin-12-ol
- CAS Number: 81-67-4
- PubChem CID: 442340
- ChemSpider: 390793
- UNII: Z9Y5O2QUPA
- ChEMBL: ChEMBL258370
- CompTox Dashboard (EPA): DTXSID00331801

Chemical and physical data
- Formula: C_{18}H_{17}NO_{3}
- Molar mass: 295.338 g·mol^{−1}
- 3D model (JSmol): Interactive image
- SMILES: CN1CCC2=CC3=C(C4=C2[C@H]1CC5=C4C(=CC=C5)O)OCO3
- InChI: InChI=1S/C18H17NO3/c1-19-6-5-11-8-14-18(22-9-21-14)17-15(11)12(19)7-10-3-2-4-13(20)16(10)17/h2-4,8,12,20H,5-7,9H2,1H3/t12-/m1/s1; Key:IKMXUUHNYQWZBC-GFCCVEGCSA-N

Pukateine is an alkaloid found in the bark of the New Zealand tree Laurelia novae-zelandiae ("Pukatea"), as well as some South American plants. An extract from pukatea is used in traditional Māori herbal medicine as an analgesic.

Bernard Cracroft Aston studied the physical and chemical characteristics of the compound, and presented a paper with his findings to the Royal Society of New Zealand on 11 May 1909.

== See also ==
- Apomorphine
- Bulbocapnine
- Glaucine
- Nantenine
- Nuciferine
- Stepholidine
- Tetrahydropalmatine
