= Gary Desir =

American physician and academic

- Born: Gary V. Desir
- Education: New York University; Yale University
- Known for: Discovery of Renalase
- Spouses: Deborah Dyett Desir
- Scientific career
- Fields: Nephrology and molecular physiology
- Workplaces: Yale University; Yale School of Medicine; VA Connecticut Healthcare System; School of Forestry and Environmental Studies; Albert Schweitzer Hospital

Gary V. Desir is a physician, researcher and medical practitioner who was appointed as the vice provost for faculty development and diversity at Yale University in March 2020. Desir is also the chair of the department of internal medicine at Yale School of Medicine, and was formerly the chair of the Yale Medicine Board. His areas of specialization include nephrology and molecular physiology, the latter specifically about potassium channels. His notable research work includes discovery of the kidney protein renalase.

== Early life and career ==
Desir was born in Haiti and has studied rhétorique from St Louis de Gonzague. He moved to the US in 1972 and in 1973 he enrolled in the bachelors program at New York University. In 1976, he graduated as a BS in biology while receiving the membership of Phi Beta Kappa. In 1980, he graduated with honors from Yale University and became part of the Alpha Omega Alpha. From 1980 to 1983 he trained in internal medicine. He took part in the fellowship program in nephrology. He worked for 3 years as the research fellowship at Yale University in nephrology with specialization in potassium channels (molecular physiology).

In 1988, Desir was appointed as an assistant professor at Yale School of Medicine. He became associate professor and professor in 1993 and 2003 respectively. From 1997 to 2004, he served as the section chief of nephrology at the VA Connecticut Healthcare System. He worked as the chair of internal medicine at VACHS from 2004 to 2013. In 2013, he was appointed on interim basis as the chair of the department of internal medicine at Yale School of Medicine. He was appointed to the permanent chair in 2015. In 2016 Desir was designated as the Paul B. Beeson Professor of Internal Medicine at Yale. Desir is also vice provost for faculty development and diversity.

== Research activities ==
Desir's most notable research activity include the discovery of the agent renalase, which is basically a renal protein. It can be classified as an enzyme as well as a hormone - such nature being decided on its site of action with the prospect of being used in dual-purpose. The primary function of renalase is as an intracellular enzyme that controls and manipulates energy production at granular level. It also has the protective characteristics that it exhibits against cell injury and stress, once it secretes in the plasma.

Desir is also the founder of biotech firm Personal Therapeutics, that works exploring the prospects of commercializing renalase and its pathway while basing the foundations in two concepts, viz. renalase agonist and renalase antagonist. Renalase agonist primarily deals with the role of renalase in mitigating tissue injury in myocardial infarction whereas renalase antagonist is based on the concept of fighting cancer cells which "highjack the renalase pathway as a survival mechanism". During covid-19 pandemic, a correlation was claimed in a Yale researchers report between low levels of the renalase and poor outcome of clinical treatment of covid patients.

== Other activities ==
Desir is an active advocate of diversity, equity and inclusion and a founding member of the Minority Organization for Retention & Expansion executive committee of Yale. Under dual teaching appointment, Desir conducts the graduate course "Sustainable Development in a Post-Disaster Context" at the School of Forestry and Environmental Studies, in collaboration with the Albert Schweitzer Hospital in Deschapelles, Haiti.

== Notable publications ==
- Jianchao Xu, Guoyong Li, Peili Wang, Heino Velazquez, Xiaoqiang Yao, Yanyan Li, Yanling Wu, Aldo Peixoto, Susan Crowley, and Gary V. Desir; Renalase is a novel, soluble monoamine oxidase that regulates cardiac function and blood pressure.
- International Union of Pharmacology. XLI. Compendium of Voltage-Gated Ion Channels: Potassium Channels George A. Gutman, K. George Chandy, John P. Adelman, Jayashree Aiyar, Douglas A. Bayliss, David E. Clapham, Manuel Covarriubias, Gary V. Desir, Kiyoshi Furuichi, Barry Ganetzky, Maria L. Garcia, Stephan Grissmer, Lily Y. Jan, Andreas Karschin, Donghee Kim, Sabina Kuperschmidt, Yoshihisa Kurachi, Michel Lazdunski, Florian Lesage, Henry A. Lester, David McKinnon, Colin G. Nichols, Ita O'Kelly, Jonathan Robbins, Gail A. Robertson, Bernardo Rudy, Michael Sanguinetti, Susumu Seino, Walter Stuehmer, Michael M. Tamkun, Carol A. Vandenberg, Aguan Wei, Heike Wulff and Randy S. Wymore
- Molecular Diversity and Regulation of Renal Potassium Channels; Steven C. Hebert, Gary Desir, Gerhard Giebisch, and Wenhui Wang
- Catecholamines Regulate the Activity, Secretion, and Synthesis of Renalase Guoyong Li, Jianchao Xu, Peili Wang, Heino Velazquez, Yanyan Li, Yanling Wu, and Gary V. Desir.
- The voltage-gated potassium channel Kv1.3 regulates peripheral insulin sensitivity Jianchao Xu, Peili Wang, Yanyan Li, Guoyong Li, Leonard K. Kaczmarek, Yanling Wu, Pandelakis A. Koni, Richard A. Flavell, and Gary V. Desir.
- Jianchao Xu, Pandelakis A. Koni, Peili Wang, Guoyong Li, Leonard Kaczmarek, Yanling Wu, Yanyan Li, Richard A. Flavell, Gary V. Desir, The voltage-gated potassium channel Kv1.3 regulates energy homeostasis and body weight, Human Molecular Genetics, Volume 12, Issue 5, 1 March 2003, Pages 551–559,
- Defective processing and expression of thiazide-sensitive Na-Cl cotransporter as a cause of Gitelman's syndrome Shanti Kunchaparty, Matthew Palcso, Jennifer Berkman, Heino Velázquez, Gary V. Desir, Paul Bernstein, Robert F. Reilly, and David H. Ellison
- Regulation of blood pressure and cardiovascular function by renalase Author links open overlay panel; Gary V.Desir
- Renalase Lowers Ambulatory Blood Pressure by Metabolizing Circulating Adrenaline Gary V. Desir, LieQi Tang, Peili Wang, Guoyong Li, Benedita Sampaio‐Maia, Janete Quelhas‐Santos, Manuel Pestana, and Heino Velazquez
- A Functional Polymorphism in Renalase (Glu37Asp) Is Associated with Cardiac Hypertrophy, Dysfunction, and Ischemia: Data from the Heart and Soul Study Ramin Farzaneh-Far, Gary V. Desir, Beeya Na, Nelson B. Schiller, Mary A. Whooley
- Renalase in hypertension and kidney disease, Nephrology Dialysis Transplantation, Gary V. Desir, Aldo J. Peixoto, Volume 29, Issue 1, January 2014, Pages 22–28,
