= Corydalis yanhusuo =

Scientific classification
- Kingdom: Plantae
- Clade: Tracheophytes
- Clade: Angiosperms
- Clade: Eudicots
- Order: Ranunculales
- Family: Papaveraceae
- Genus: Corydalis
- Species: C. yanhusuo

Binomial name
- Corydalis yanhusuo W.T.Wang

Species of flowering plant in the poppy family

Corydalis yanhusuo is a plant species in the genus Corydalis. The Chinese name for Corydalis yanhusuo is yan hu suo (Chinese: 延胡索; pinyin: yán hú suǒ; lit. 'extended barbarian rope'). The Japanese common name is engosaku (エンゴサク) and the Korean common name is hyeonhosaek (현호색). English common names include yanhusuo, corydalis, and Asian corydalis. The tuber of this plant, frequently mislabeled as the root, is an important therapeutic agent in traditional Chinese medicine. It is native to high-altitude grasslands across China including in the provinces of Anhui, Henan, Hubei, Hunan, Jiangsu, and Zhejiang, but is more widely cultivated.

== Description ==
According to the Flora of China, this perennial herbaceous plant produces 5 to 15 purple-blue tubular flowers in clusters that curve out at the opening. The yellow, round tubers are up to 2.5 cm (1 in) in diameter.

== History ==
Yanhusuo is first mentioned in Ben Cao Shi Yi (Omissions from the Materia Medica), written by Chen Cang-Qi in 720 CE.

== Chemical compounds ==
The alkaloid dehydrocorybulbine (DHCB) can be extracted from the roots of the plant. Tetrahydropalmatine is another major constituent alkaloid. Corydalis yanhusuo also contains the alkaloids glaucine and palmatine. It also contains the acetylcholinesterase inhibitor corydaline. N-Methyltetrahydroprotoberberines have been isolated from C. yanhusuo.
