= Dehydrocorybulbine =

Names
- IUPAC name 3-Hydroxy-2,9,10-trimethoxy-13-methyl-7,8,13,13a-tetradehydroberbin-7-ium
- Systematic IUPAC name 3-Hydroxy-2,9,10-trimethoxy-13-methyl-5,6-dihydro-7λ^{5}-isoquinolino[3,2-a]isoquinolin-7-ylium

Identifiers
CAS Number	59870-72-3
3D model (JSmol)	Interactive image
ChEMBL	ChEMBL3343658
ChemSpider	4475496
PubChem CID	5316439
CompTox Dashboard (EPA)	DTXSID301045755
- InChI: InChI=1S/C21H21NO4/c1-12-14-5-6-18(24-2)21(26-4)16(14)11-22-8-7-13-9-17(23)19(25-3)10-15(13)20(12)22/h5-6,9-11H,7-8H2,1-4H3/p+1 Key: XWCVASCMRTXXRY-UHFFFAOYSA-O
- SMILES: O(c4cc3c2c(c1ccc(OC)c(OC)c1c[n+]2CCc3cc4O)C)C

Properties
Chemical formula	C_{21}H_{22}NO_{4}^{+}
Molar mass	352.40 g/mol
- Except where otherwise noted, data are given for materials in their standard state (at 25 °C [77 °F], 100 kPa). Infobox references

Dehydrocorybulbine (DHCB) is a protoberberine isoquinoline alkaloid isolated from the tuber of Corydalis yanhusuo. It is being studied for its potential analgesic properties, particularly for neuropathic and inflammatory pain.

Its primary analgesic mechanism is antagonism of the dopamine D2 receptor (D2R). Unlike opioid analgesics, preclinical studies found that DHCB does not induce antinociceptive tolerance. It also possesses a distinct anti-neuroinflammatory mechanism by inhibiting purinergic P2X4 receptor (P2X4R).

== Pharmacology ==
=== Dopamine D2 receptor antagonism ===
The primary mechanism of action for DHCB's analgesic effect is antagonism of the dopamine D2 receptor (D2R). A 2014 study in Current Biology identified DHCB as the component of Corydalis extract responsible for this effect. The study confirmed this mechanism by demonstrating that DHCB's analgesic properties were absent in D2 receptor knockout (KO) mice.

This D2-based mechanism is a significant finding, as it is non-opioid and, as the study proved, "causes no antinociceptive tolerance". This differentiates it from traditional opioid pain relievers, which typically lose efficacy over time and lead to dependence. This finding corrected earlier hypotheses that had suggested the dopamine D1 receptor was the primary target.

=== Anti-neuroinflammatory mechanism ===
In addition to its dopaminergic activity, DHCB possesses a distinct anti-neuroinflammatory mechanism relevant to neuropathic pain. A 2019 study found that in preclinical models of spinal cord injury (SCI), DHCB provided pain relief by mitigating the upregulation of the purinergic P2X4 receptor (P2X4R).

P2X4Rs are primarily expressed on spinal microglia and are key mediators of neuropathic pain signaling following neuronal injury. The study found that DHCB's inhibition of P2X4R upregulation was associated with a reduction in the release of pro-inflammatory cytokines, including interleukin-1𝛽 (IL-1𝛽) and interleukin-18 (IL-18).
