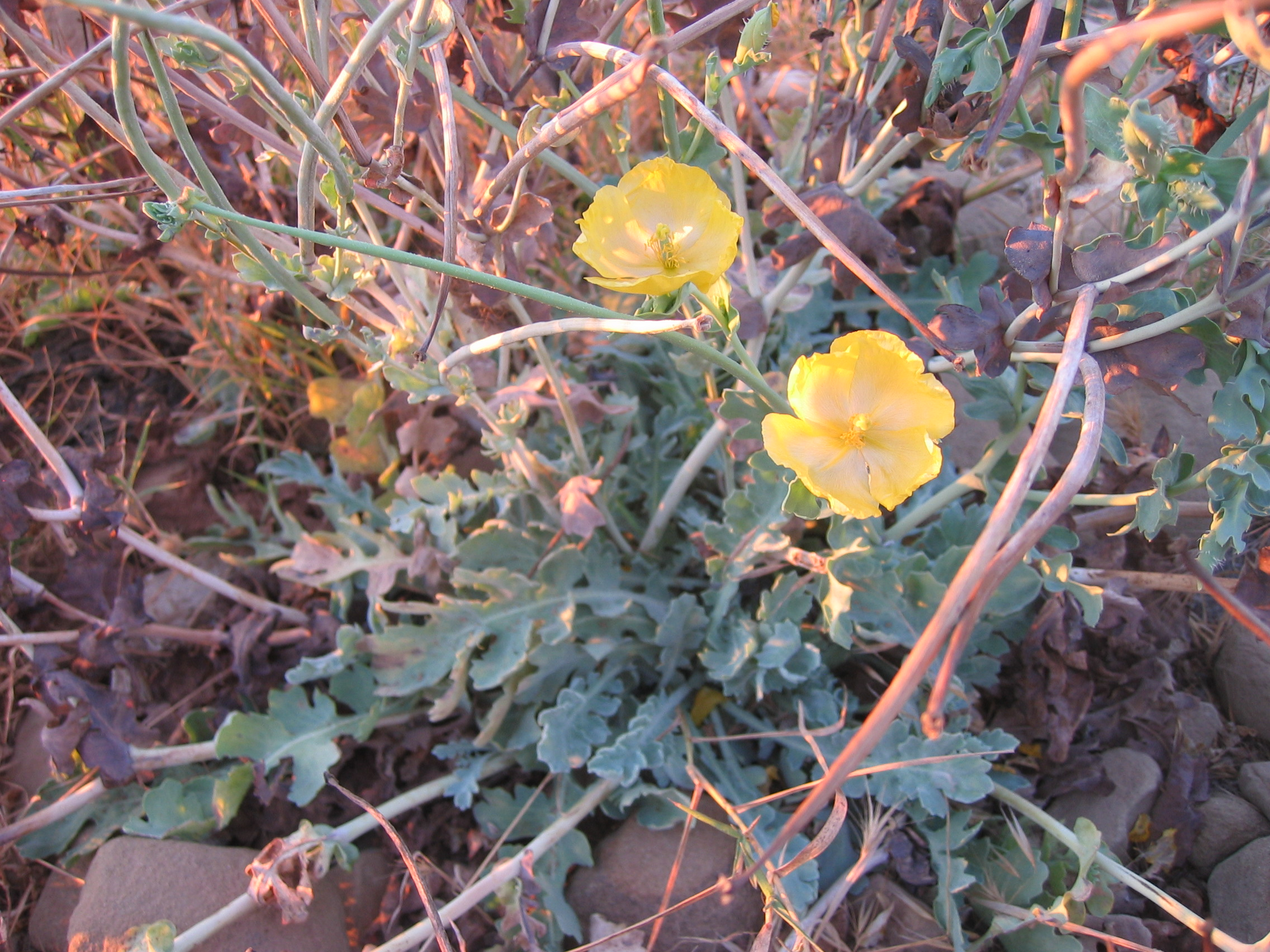
- A Glaucium species growing on the coast of Algeria

Scientific classification
- Kingdom: Plantae
- Clade: Tracheophytes
- Clade: Angiosperms
- Clade: Eudicots
- Order: Ranunculales
- Family: Papaveraceae
- Subfamily: Papaveroideae
- Tribe: Chelidonieae
- Genus: Glaucium; Mill.

Species
- See text

= Glaucium =

Genus of flowering plants

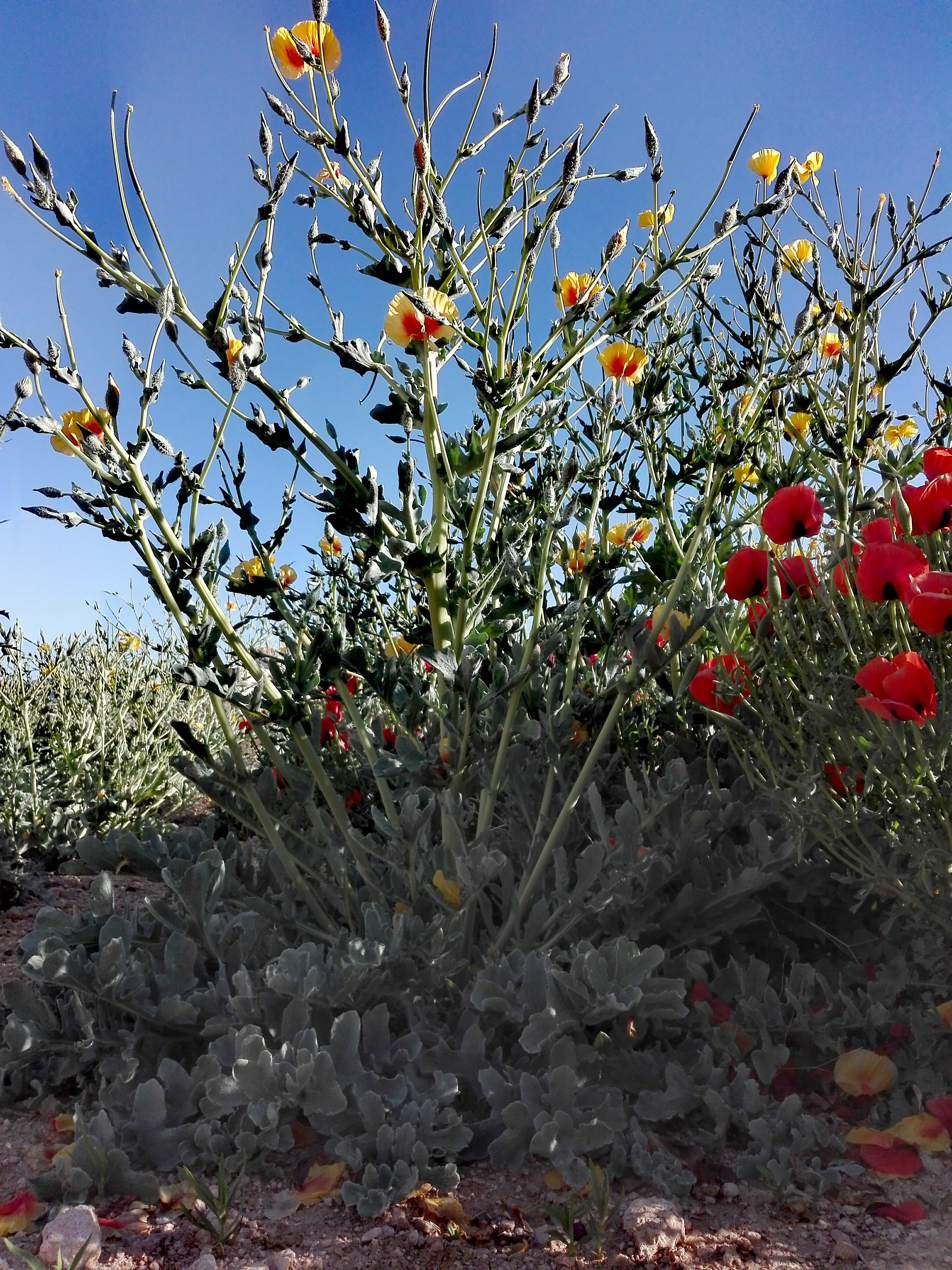
Glaucium sp. Fars province of Iran

Glaucium (horned poppy) is a genus of about 25 species of annual, biennial or perennial herbaceous flowering plants in the family Papaveraceae, native to Europe, north Africa, and southwest and central Asia. The species commonly occur in saline habitats, including coasts and salt pans.

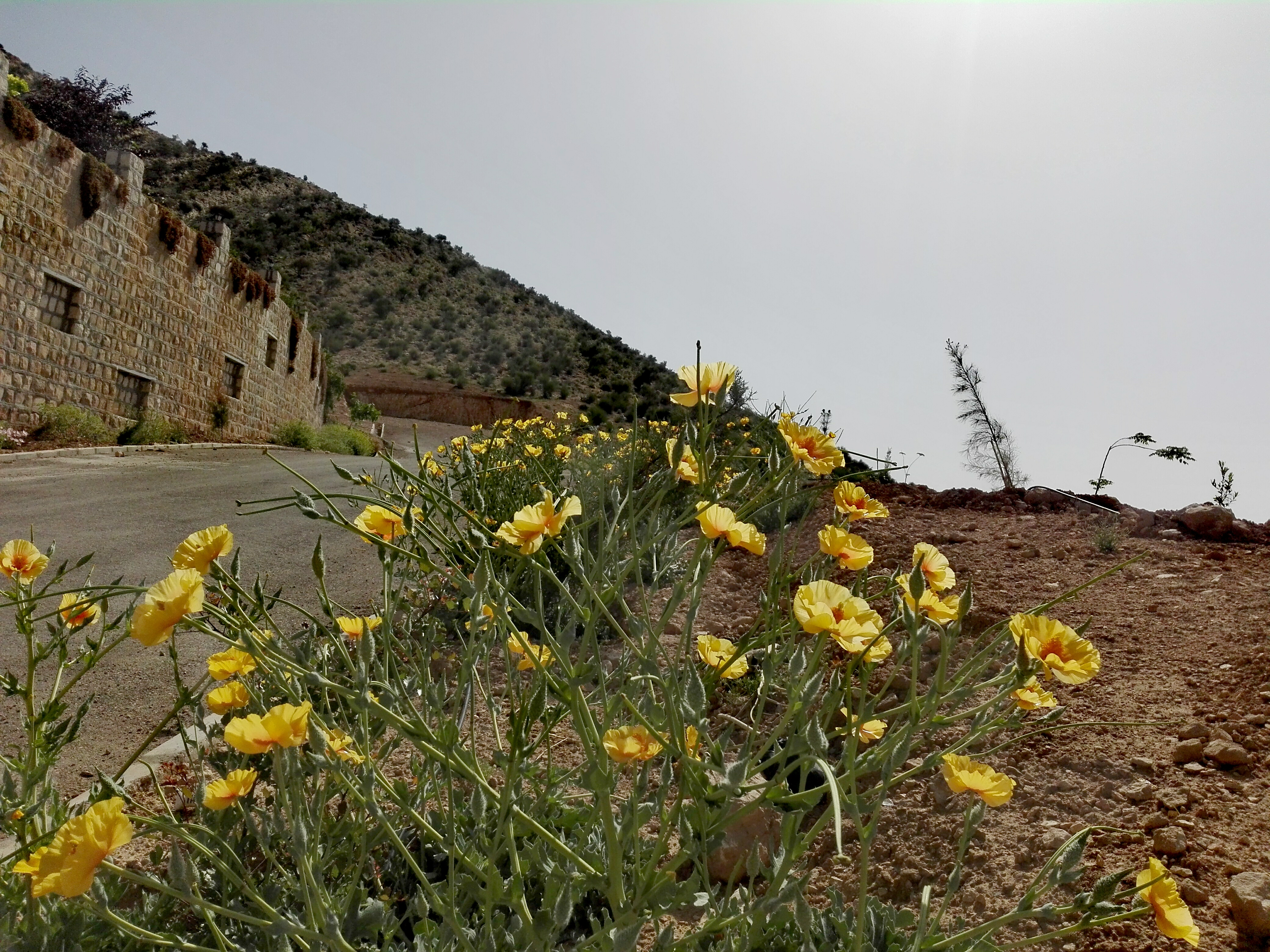
Glaucium vitellinum

== List of species ==
As of October 2024, Plants of the World Online accepted the following species:

- Glaucium acutidentatum Hausskn. & Bornm.
- Glaucium afghanicum Kitam.
- Glaucium alakirensis Aykurt, K.Yıldız & Özçandır
- Glaucium aleppicum Boiss. & Hausskn.
- Glaucium arabicum Fresen.
- Glaucium calycinum Boiss.
- Glaucium cappadocicum Boiss.
- Glaucium contortuplicatum Boiss.
- Glaucium corniculatum (L.) Rudolph (sea poppy)
- Glaucium cuneatum Cullen
- Glaucium elbursium Mory
- Glaucium elegans Fisch. & C.A.Mey.
- Glaucium fimbrilligerum Boiss.
- Glaucium flavum Crantz (yellow horned poppy)
- Glaucium grandiflorum Boiss. & A.Huet (grand-flowered horned poppy)
- Glaucium insigne Popov
- Glaucium leiocarpum Boiss.
- Glaucium mathiolifolium Mobayen
- Glaucium oxylobum Boiss. & Buhse
- Glaucium quadratifolium Fedde
- Glaucium refractocarpum Gilli
- Glaucium secmenii Yıld.
- Glaucium squamigerum Kar. & Kir.
- Glaucium vitellinum Boiss. & Buhse
- Glaucium yazdianum Tavakkoli & Assadi
