= Bulbocapnine =

Chemical compound

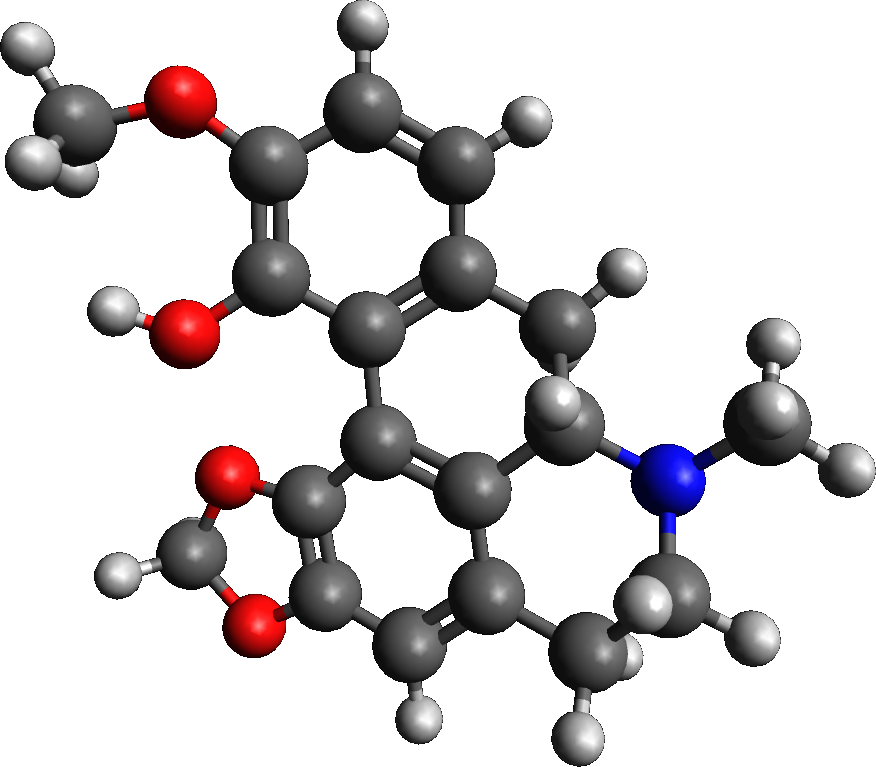

Clinical data
- Other names: Bulbokaprin

Identifiers
- IUPAC name: (12S)-17-methoxy-11-methyl-3,5-dioxa-11-azapentacyclo[10.7.1.02,6.08,20.014,19]icosa-1(20),2(6),7,14(19),15,17-hexaen-18-ol
- CAS Number: 298-45-3
- PubChem CID: 12441
- ChemSpider: 11934
- UNII: O0TGI865QO
- KEGG: C09367
- ChEBI: CHEBI:3211
- ChEMBL: ChEMBL157912
- CompTox Dashboard (EPA): DTXSID20183940
- ECHA InfoCard: 100.005.511

Chemical and physical data
- Formula: C_{19}H_{19}NO_{4}
- Molar mass: 325.364 g·mol^{−1}
- 3D model (JSmol): Interactive image
- Melting point: 201 to 203 °C (394 to 397 °F); Racemate 213–214 °C
- SMILES: O1c4c(OC1)c3c2c(O)c(OC)ccc2C[C@H]5c3c(c4)CCN5C
- InChI: InChI=1S/C19H19NO4/c1-20-6-5-11-8-14-19(24-9-23-14)17-15(11)12(20)7-10-3-4-13(22-2)18(21)16(10)17/h3-4,8,12,21H,5-7,9H2,1-2H3/t12-/m0/s1; Key:LODGIKWNLDQZBM-LBPRGKRZSA-N

Bulbocapnine is an alkaloid found in Corydalis (notably the European species C. cava) and Dicentra, genera of the plant family Fumariaceae which have caused (notably the American species Corydalis caseana) the fatal poisoning of sheep and cattle. It has been shown to act as an acetylcholinesterase inhibitor, and inhibits biosynthesis of dopamine via inhibition of the enzyme tyrosine hydroxylase. Like apomorphine, it is reported to be an inhibitor of amyloid beta protein (Aβ) fiber formation, whose presence is a hallmark of Alzheimer's disease (AD). Bulbocapnine is thus a potential therapeutic under the amyloid hypothesis. According to the Dorlands Medical Dictionary, it "inhibits the reflex and motor activities of striated muscle. It has been used in the treatment of muscular tremors and vestibular nystagmus".

A psychiatrist at Tulane University named Robert Heath carried out experiments on prisoners at the Louisiana State Penitentiary using bulbocapnine to induce stupor. This work at Tulane inspired, and was continued parallel to, experiments carried out at the behest of the Central Intelligence Agency. The bulbocapnine work Heath conducted for the government was one component of a large investigation into the potential of psychoactive compounds as aids to interrogation.

== Effects ==
It can induce catalepsy featuring the curious symptom of waxy flexibility and the state produced by the drug has been compared to Akinetic mutism.

== See also ==
- Apomorphine
- Glaucine
- Nantenine
- Nuciferine
- Pukateine
- Stepholidine
- Tetrahydropalmatine
