= Glaucium cuneatum =

Scientific classification
- Kingdom: Plantae
- Clade: Embryophytes
- Clade: Tracheophytes
- Clade: Spermatophytes
- Clade: Angiosperms
- Clade: Eudicots
- Order: Ranunculales
- Family: Papaveraceae
- Genus: Glaucium
- Species: G. cuneatum

Binomial name
- Glaucium cuneatum Cullen

Species of flowering plant

Glaucium cuneatum is a species of flowering plant in horned poppy genus which is native to Iraq.
