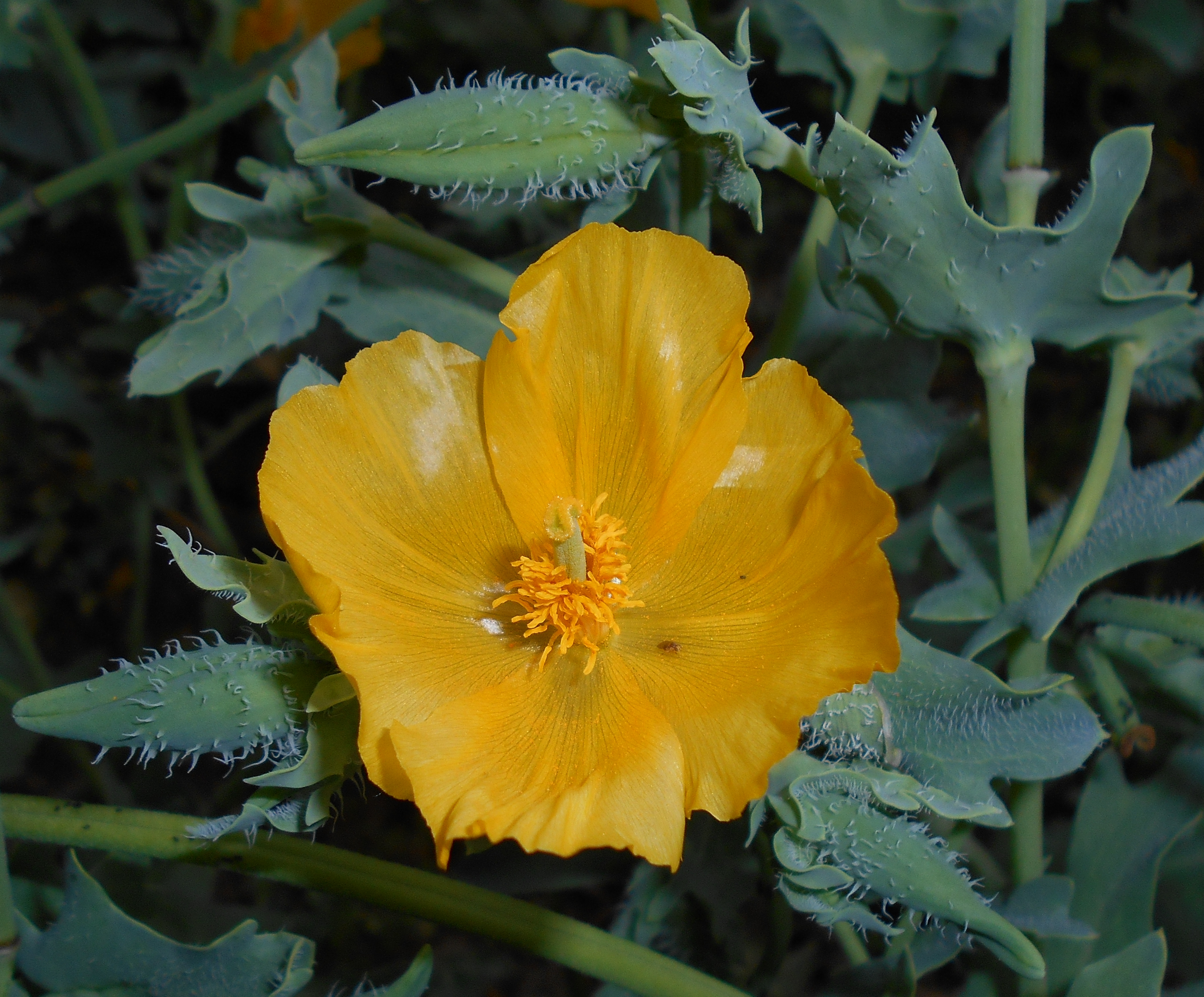

Scientific classification
- Kingdom: Plantae
- Clade: Tracheophytes
- Clade: Angiosperms
- Clade: Eudicots
- Order: Ranunculales
- Family: Papaveraceae
- Genus: Glaucium
- Species: G. flavum

Binomial name
- Glaucium flavum Crantz

Synonyms
- Synonyms: Chelidonium fulvum; Poir.; Chelidonium glaucium; L.; Chelidonium glaucum; Hill; Chelidonium littorale; Salisb.; Glaucium corniculatum var. braunianum; Kuntze; Glaucium corniculatum var. flavum; (Crantz) Kuntze; Glaucium corniculatum var. fulvum; (Sm.) Kuntze; Glaucium corniculatum f. grandiflorum; Kuntze; Glaucium corniculatum var. mauritanicum; Kuntze; Glaucium corniculatum f. sublobatum; Kuntze; Glaucium corniculatum var. tricolor; (Godr.) Kuntze; Glaucium fischeri; Bernh.; Glaucium flavum var. fulvum; (Sm.) Fedde; Glaucium flavum f. obtusilobum; Fedde; Glaucium flavum var. plenum; Halácsy; Glaucium flavum var. serpieri; (Heldr.) Halácsy; Glaucium flavum f. subleiocarpum; Kuzmanov & Gegova; Glaucium fulvum; Sm.; Glaucium glaucium (L.); H.Karst. [Invalid]; Glaucium glaucum; Moench; Glaucium littorale; Salisb.; Glaucium luteum; Crantz [Illegitimate]; Glaucium luteum; Scop.; Glaucium luteum var. glabratum; Willk. & Lange; Glaucium luteum var. vestitum; Willk. & Lange; Glaucium maculatum; Szov.; Glaucium richardsonii; Bernh. ex Fedde; Glaucium serpieri; Heldr.

= Glaucium flavum =

Species of flowering plant

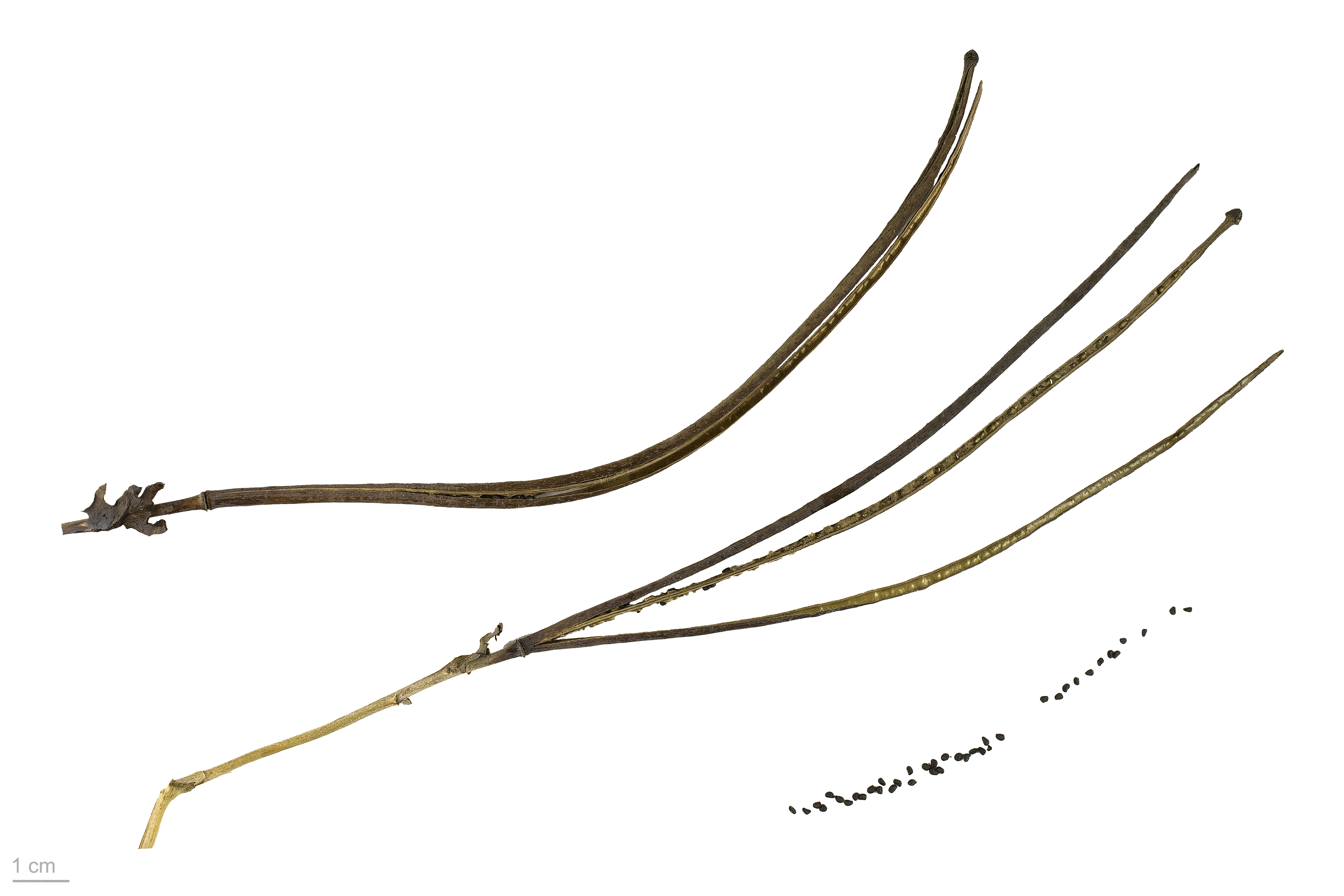

Glaucium flavum, the yellow horned poppy, yellow hornpoppy or sea poppy, is a summer flowering plant in the family Papaveraceae. It is native to Europe, Northern Africa, Macaronesia and temperate zones in Western Asia. The plant grows on the seashore and is never found inland. All parts of the plant, including the seeds, are toxic. It is classed as a noxious weed in some areas of North America, where it is an introduced species. It is grown in gardens as a short-lived perennial but usually grown as a biennial.

== Description ==
It has thick, leathery deeply segmented, wavy, bluish-grey leaves, which are coated in a layer of water-retaining wax. The sepal, petals and stamen have a similar structure and form to the red poppy (Papaver rhoeas), except the sepals are not hairy. It grows up to 30–90 cm (1–3 ft) tall, on branched, grey stems. It blooms in summer, between June and October. It has bright yellow or orange flowers, that are 7.5 cm (3 in) across. Later, it produces a very long, upright, thin, distinctive horn shaped capsule, which is 15–30 cm (6–12 in) long. It is divided into two chambers, which split open to reveal the seeds.

== Taxonomy ==
It was first published and described by Heinrich Johann Nepomuk von Crantz in 'Stirp. Austr. Fasc.' (Stirpium Austriarum) vol.2 on page 133 in 1763. The species epithet flavum is Latin for yellow and indicates its flower colour.

It is commonly known as sea-poppy, horned-poppy, and yellow horned-poppy.

G. flavum was verified by United States Department of Agriculture and the Agricultural Research Service on 25 May 1995, then updated on 9 May 2011, and is an accepted name by the Royal Horticultural Society.

== Distribution and habitat ==
It is native to temperate regions of North Africa, Europe and parts of Western Asia.

=== Range ===
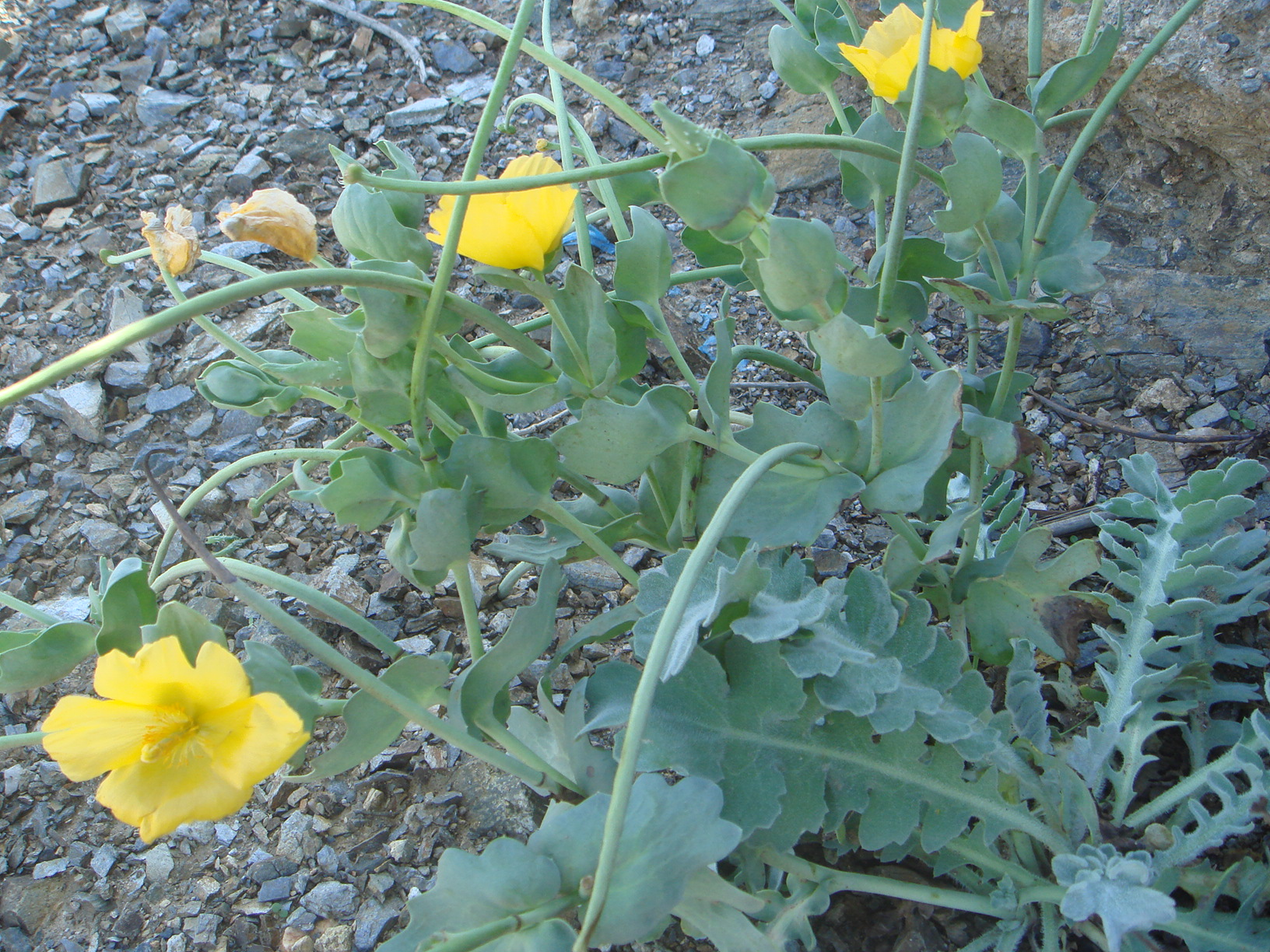
Growing in sand in Spain

It is found in North Africa, within Macaronesia, Canary Islands, Algeria, Libya, Tunisia and Morocco. Within Western Asia it is found in the Caucasus, Georgia, Cyprus, Egypt (in the Sinai), Lebanon, Syria and Turkey. In eastern Europe, it is found within Ukraine. In middle Europe, it is in Belgium, Germany, Netherlands and Slovakia. In northern Europe, in Denmark, Ireland, Norway, Sweden and United Kingdom. In south-eastern Europe, within Albania, Bosnia and Herzegovina, Bulgaria, Croatia, Greece, Italy, Montenegro, Sicily and Malta, North Macedonia, Romania, and Slovenia. In southwestern Europe, it is found in France, Portugal and Spain.

=== Habitat ===
It grows in coastal habitats on shingle banks and beaches, but can also be found on cliff tops and in sand dunes.

== Toxicity ==
It produces an orange foul-smelling sap, if cut open. All parts of the plant, including the seeds, are toxic, and can cause a wide range of symptoms if eaten, and respiratory failure, resulting in death.

== Culture ==
It is referenced in various poems.

A poppy grows upon the shore,
Bursts her twin cups in summer late:
Her leaves are glaucus-green and hoar,
Her petals yellow, delicate.

She has no lovers like the red,
That dances with the noble corn:
Her blossoms on the waves are shed,
Where she stands shivering and forlorn.

Shorter Poems Robert Bridges.

Sea Poppies:

Amber husk
fluted with gold,
fruit on the sand
marked with a rich grain,

treasure
spilled near the shrub-pines
to bleach on the boulders:

your stalk has caught root
among wet pebbles
and drift flung by the sea
and grated shells
and split conch-shells.

Beautiful, widespread,
fire upon leaf,
what meadow yields
so fragrant a leaf
as your bright leaf?

H.D.

== Uses ==
Glaucine is the main alkaloid component in Glaucium flavum. Glaucine has bronchodilator and antiinflammatory effects, acting as a PDE_{4} inhibitor and calcium channel blocker, and is used medically as an antitussive in some countries. Glaucine may produce side effects such as sedation, fatigue, and a hallucinogenic effect characterised by colourful visual images, and as a recreational drug. For a detailed bibliography on glaucine and Glaucium flavum see: National Agricultural Library.

In the past, it was known in Hampshire, UK, as 'squatmore', and the roots were used to treat bruises, and pains in the breast, stomach and intestines.

== Other sources ==
- Pink, A. (2004). Gardening for the Million – via Project Gutenberg Literary Archive Foundation.
- Aldén, B., S. Ryman, & M. Hjertson Svensk Kulturväxtdatabas,
- Boulos, L. Flora of Egypt checklist. 1995 (L Egypt)
- Cooper, M. R. & A. W. Johnson Poisonous plants and fungi in Britain: animal and human poisoning. 1998 (Cooper & Johnson ed2)
- Davis, P. H., ed. Flora of Turkey and the east Aegean islands. 1965–1988 (F Turk)
- Farnsworth, N. R. & D. D. Soejarto Global importance of medicinal plants (unpublished draft manuscript rev. 23, 1988) (Import Medicinal Pl)
- Gleason, H. A. & A. Cronquist Manual of vascular plants of northeastern United States and adjacent Canada, ed. 2. 1991 (Glea Cron ed2)
- Greuter, W. et al., eds. Med-Checklist. 1984- (L Medit)
- Grey-Wilson, C. Poppies: The poppy family in the wild and in cultivation. 1993 (Poppies) 41.
- Groth, D. 2005. pers. comm. (pers. comm.)
- Hansen, A. & P. Sunding Flora of Macaronesia: checklist of vascular plants, ed. 4. Sommerfeltia vol. 17. 1993 (L Macar ed4)
- Holm, L. et al. A geographical atlas of world weeds. 1979 (Atlas WWeed)
- Izquierdo Z., I. et al., eds. Lista de especies silvestres de Canarias: hongos, plantas y animales terrestres. 2004 (L Canarias)
- Janick, J. & J. Simon, eds. Advances in new crops. 1990 (Adv New Crops)
- Kartesz, J. T. A synonymized checklist of the vascular flora of the United States, Canada, and Greenland. 1994 (L US Can ed2)
- Komarov, V. L. et al., eds. Flora SSSR. 1934–1964 (F USSR)
- Lazarides, M. & B. Hince CSIRO Handbook of Economic Plants of Australia. 1993 (Econ Pl Aust)
- Mabberley, D. J. The plant-book: a portable dictionary of the vascular plants, ed. 2. 1997 (Pl Book)
- Mouterde, P. Nouvelle flore du Liban et de la Syrie. 1966- (F Liban)
- Personal Care Products Council International Nomenclature Cosmetic Ingredient (INCI)
- Tutin, T. G. et al., eds. Flora europaea, second edition. 1993 (F Eur ed2)
- Wiersema, J. H. & B. León World economic plants: a standard reference (on-line edition) [medicinal plants only]. (World Econ Pl Med)
- Zohary, M. & N. Feinbrun-Dothan Flora palaestina. 1966- (F Palest)
