= Tetrahydrocolumbamine 2-O-methyltransferase =

tetrahydrocolumbamine 2-O-methyltransferase

Identifiers
- EC no.: 2.1.1.89
- CAS no.: 93792-09-7

Databases
- IntEnz: IntEnz view
- BRENDA: BRENDA entry
- ExPASy: NiceZyme view
- KEGG: KEGG entry
- MetaCyc: metabolic pathway
- PRIAM: profile
- PDB structures: RCSB PDB PDBe PDBsum
- Gene Ontology: AmiGO / QuickGO
Search
- PMC: articles
- PubMed: articles
- NCBI: proteins

In enzymology, tetrahydrocolumbamine 2-O-methyltransferase (EC 2.1.1.89) is an enzyme that catalyzes the chemical reaction:

(S)-isocorypalmine
+ SAM
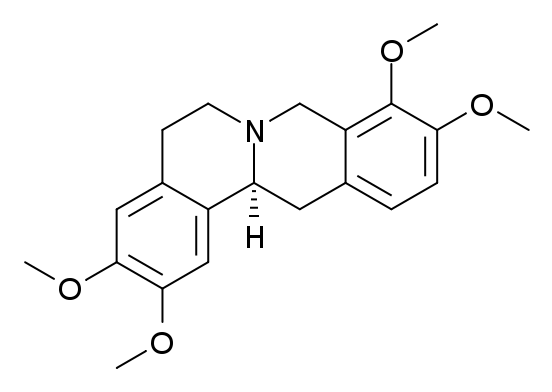
tetrahydropalmatine
+ SAH

In this methylation reaction, the enzyme uses the cofactor, S-adenosyl methionine (SAM) which transfers a methyl group, giving S-adenosyl-L-homocysteine (SAH) as a by-product. There are several similar transformations in the chemistry of isoquinoline alkaloids.

This enzyme belongs to the family of transferases, specifically those transferring one-carbon group methyltransferases. The systematic name of this enzyme class is S-adenosyl-L-methionine:5,8,13,13a-tetrahydrocolumbamine 2-O-methyltransferase. This enzyme is also called tetrahydrocolumbamine methyltransferase. This enzyme participates in alkaloid biosynthesis.
