= Glaucine =

Chemical compound

- (S)-Glaucine, the enantiomer mainly found in nature and used medically

Clinical data
- Trade names: Glauvent, Tusidil, Tussiglaucin, Broncholytin, Broncholitin
- Other names: (S)-Glaucine; 1,2,9,10-Tetramethoxyaporphine; Tetramethoxyaporphine; Boldine dimethyl ether
- AHFS/Drugs.com: International Drug Names
- Drug class: Antitussive (cough suppressant); Hallucinogen
- ATC code: None

Identifiers
- IUPAC name: (S)-5,6,6a,7-tetrahydro-1,2,9,10-tetramethoxy-6-methyl-4H-dibenzo[de,g]quinoline
- CAS Number: 475-81-0 5630-11-5
- PubChem CID: 16754
- ChemSpider: 15883
- UNII: NU19306XA7
- KEGG: D08014
- ChEBI: CHEBI:5373
- ChEMBL: ChEMBL228082
- NIAID ChemDB: 011385
- CompTox Dashboard (EPA): DTXSID8031100
- ECHA InfoCard: 100.006.820

Chemical and physical data
- Formula: C_{21}H_{25}NO_{4}
- Molar mass: 355.434 g·mol^{−1}
- 3D model (JSmol): Interactive image
- SMILES: CN1CCc2cc(c(c-3c2[C@@H]1Cc4c3cc(c(c4)OC)OC)OC)OC
- InChI: InChI=1S/C21H25NO4/c1-22-7-6-12-9-18(25-4)21(26-5)20-14-11-17(24-3)16(23-2)10-13(14)8-15(22)19(12)20/h9-11,15H,6-8H2,1-5H3/t15-/m0/s1; Key:RUZIUYOSRDWYQF-HNNXBMFYSA-N

Glaucine, also known as 1,2,9,10-tetramethoxyaporphine and sold under the brand names Glauvent and Tusidil among others, is an aporphine alkaloid, antitussive (cough suppressant), and hallucinogen. It is found in several different plant species in the family Papaveraceae, such as Glaucium flavum, Glaucium oxylobum, and Corydalis yanhusuo, and in other plants such as Croton lechleri in the family Euphorbiaceae. Glaucine was first described following isolation from Glaucium flavum in 1839 and its chemical structure became known in 1911.

== Uses ==
=== Medical ===
Glaucine is currently used as an antitussive agent in Iceland, as well as Romania, Bulgaria, Russia and other Eastern European countries. Bulgarian pharmaceutical company Sopharma sells glaucine in tablet form, where a single dose contains 40 mg. It is known to be sold over-the-counter.

=== Recreational ===
Reports of recreational use of glaucine have been published, and effects include dissociative-type symptoms; feeling detached and "in another world, as well as nausea, vomiting, and dilated pupils. These reports mirror those about the effects of clinical use, which state dissociative-type symptoms as well as lethargy, fatigue, and hallucinations. Investigation of side effects in a clinical setting also reports that the hallucinatory effects manifest as bright and colorful visualizations. They further report that patients perceive their environments clearly yet feel detached from it; "the patient sees and understands everything and is oriented well enough, but cannot take a clear and adequate action".

One particular report of recreational use gone awry described the form of distribution as tablets being marketed as a 1-benzylpiperazine (BZP)-free "herbal high" which the patient referred to as "head candy".

== Side effects ==
Glaucine may produce side effects such as sedation, sleepiness, fatigue, weakness, nausea, pupil dilation, and hallucinogenic effects such as visual hallucinations and dissociation.

== Pharmacology ==
=== Pharmacodynamics ===
Glaucine binds to the benzothiazepine site on L-type Ca^{2+}-channels, thereby blocking calcium ion channels in smooth muscle like the human bronchus. Glaucine has no effect on intracellular calcium stores, but rather, does not allow the entry of Ca^{2+} after intracellular stores have been depleted. Ca^{2+} influx is a vital component in the process of muscular contraction, and the blocking of this influx therefore reduces the ability of the muscle to contract. In this way, glaucine can prevent smooth muscle from contracting, allowing it to relax.

It is a non-competitive selective inhibitor of PDE4 in human bronchial tissue and granulocytes. PDE4 is an isoenzyme that hydrolyzes cyclic AMP to regulate human bronchial tone (along with PDE3). Yet as a PDE4 inhibitor, glaucine possesses very low potency.

Glaucine has been found to act on the serotonin 5-HT_{2} receptors. (S)-Glaucine is partial agonist of the serotonin 5-HT_{2A} and 5-HT_{2C} receptors, whereas (R)-glaucine is a positive allosteric modulator of the serotonin 5-HT_{2A} receptor and possibly of the other two serotonin 5-HT_{2} receptors. At the serotonin 5-HT_{2A} receptor, (S)-glaucine showed an affinity (K_{i}) of 966 nM, EC_{50} of 661 nM, and an E_{max} of 42%, whereas at the serotonin 5-HT_{2C} receptor, it displayed an EC_{50} of 447 nM and an E_{max} of 52%. Activation of the serotonin 5-HT_{2A} receptor is notably known to be responsible for the hallucinogenic effects of serotonergic psychedelics like psilocybin, LSD, and mescaline. However, while activation of the serotonin 5-HT_{2A} receptor may be involved, the underlying mechanism of action responsible for the hallucinogenic effects of glaucine remains unknown. Glaucine also shows affinity for the serotonin 5-HT_{1A} and 5-HT_{7} receptors (K_{i} = 171 nM and 43 nM, respectively).

Both (R)-glaucine and (S)-glaucine antagonize the α_{1}-adrenergic receptor. Glaucine has been demonstrated to be a dopamine receptor antagonist, favoring dopamine D_{1} and D_{1}-like receptors. Besides actions on monoamine receptors, glaucine inhibits monoamine oxidase A (MAO-A), but its IC_{50} could not be determined due to solubility issues.

It has bronchodilator, neuroleptic, and antiinflammatory effects, acting as a PDE4 inhibitor and calcium channel blocker, TLRs plays role in its anti inflammatory effects. Glaucine has been reported to reduce blood pressure and heart rate and to possess anticonvulsant and antinociceptive effects in animals.

=== Pharmacokinetics ===
The pharmacokinetics of glaucine have been studied in humans and in horses. In addition, the in-vitro human metabolism of glaucine has been studied.

== Chemistry ==
=== Stereoisomerism ===
Glaucine is a racemic mixture of (S)- and (R)- enantiomers. (S)-Glaucine is the form that mainly occurs in nature. However, while it was originally believed that only (S)-glaucine occurs in nature, (R)-glaucine has since been found in fire poppy (Papaver californicum). The form used in medicine appears to exclusively be the (S) enantiomer and not the racemic mixture or (R)- enantiomer.

Glaucine stereoisomerism
(RS)-Glaucine (racemic glaucine)

(S)-Glaucine (glaucine)

(R)-Glaucine

=== Synthesis ===
The chemical synthesis of glaucine has been described.

=== Analogues ===
Analogues of glaucine include other aporphine alkaloids like apomorphine, boldine, bulbocapnine, nantenine, nuciferine, and pukateine, among many others.

Certain synthetic analogues of glaucine such as 2-hydroxy-11-(2-methylallyl)oxynoraporphine are known to act as highly potent and high-efficacy serotonin 5-HT_{2A} and 5-HT_{2C} receptor agonists.

== History ==
Glaucine was first described by J. M. Probst via isolation from Glaucium flavum (yellow horned poppy) in 1839. However, its chemical identity was not elucidated until later by other researchers, such as Richard Fischer in 1901 (chemical formula) and J. Gadamer (chemical structure) in 1911. The drug subsequently came to be used medically as an antitussive (cough suppressant) in some Eastern European countries. Glaucine was reported to produce hallucinogenic effects in 1989. Later, it was reported as a novel designer recreational drug in 2008. The drug was found to act as a serotonin 5-HT_{2A} receptor partial agonist and positive allosteric modulator in 2019.

== Society and culture ==
=== Availability ===
Glaucine is marketed for use as an antitussive (cough suppressant) in Bulgaria, Croatia, and Romania.

== Research ==
=== Asthma ===
When ingested orally has been found to increase airway conductance in humans, and has been investigated as a treatment for asthma. The bronchodilator activity of glaucine is thought to be related to its phosphodiesterase PDE4 inhibition.

== See also ==
- Aporphine alkaloid
- List of miscellaneous serotonin 5-HT_{2A} receptor agonists
