= Renalase =

Mammalian protein found in Homo sapiens

RNLS

Identifiers
- Aliases: RNLS, C10orf59, RENALASE, renalase, FAD-dependent amine oxidase, renalase, FAD dependent amine oxidase
- External IDs: OMIM: 609360; MGI: 1915045; GeneCards: RNLS
Available structures
PDB	Ortholog search: PDBe RCSB
PDB	List of PDB id codes 3QJ4
Enzyme activity
EC #	BRENDA	ExPASy	KEGG	MetaCyc
1.6.3.5	↗	↗	↗	↗

Gene location (Human)
Chr.	Chromosome 10 (human)
Band	10q23.31	Start	88,273,864 bp
Band	10q23.31	End	88,584,530 bp

Gene location (Mouse)
Chr.	Chromosome 19 (mouse)
Band	19|19 C1	Start	33,115,147 bp
Band	19|19 C1	End	33,369,695 bp
RNA expression pattern
Bgee	Human / Mouse (ortholog); Top expressed in: buccal mucosa cell; right adrenal gland; left adrenal gland; right adrenal cortex; left adrenal cortex; gonad; stromal cell of endometrium; parotid gland; muscle of thigh; gastrocnemius muscle / Top expressed in: spermatocyte; seminiferous tubule; spermatid; muscle of thigh; soleus muscle; right kidney; sternocleidomastoid muscle; secondary oocyte; atrioventricular valve; tibialis anterior muscle; More reference expression data
BioGPS	n/a
Gene ontology
Molecular function	oxidoreductase activity; oxidoreductase activity, acting on NAD(P)H; epinephrine binding; NADH binding; monoamine oxidase activity
Cellular component	extracellular space; extracellular region
Biological process	response to ischemia; response to epinephrine; response to salt; response to catecholamine; NAD biosynthesis via nicotinamide riboside salvage pathway; negative regulation of heart rate; negative regulation of blood pressure
Sources:Amigo / QuickGO
Orthologs
Databases	NCBI: entry; OMA: entry
Species	Human	Mouse
Entrez	55328	67795
Ensembl	ENSG00000184719	ENSMUSG00000071573
UniProt	Q5VYX0	A7RDN6
RefSeq (mRNA)	NM_001031709; NM_018363	NM_001146342; NM_001368833; NM_181587
RefSeq (protein)	NP_001026879; NP_060833	NP_001355762
Location (UCSC)	Chr 10: 88.27 – 88.58 Mb	Chr 19: 33.12 – 33.37 Mb
PubMed search
- Wikidata
View/Edit Human	View/Edit Mouse

Renalase, FAD-dependent amine oxidase is an enzyme that in humans is encoded by the RNLS gene. Renalase is a flavin adenine dinucleotide-dependent amine oxidase that is secreted into the blood from the kidney.

== Structure ==
=== Gene ===
The gene encoding this protein is called RNLS (also known as C10orf59 or FLJ11218). The renalase gene has 9 exons spanning approximately 311,000 bp and resides on chromosome 10 at q23.33.

=== Protein ===
The renalase protein consists of a putative secretory signal peptide (SignalP score of 0.4), a flavin adenine dinucleotide (FAD)-binding region, and an oxidase domain. At least four alternative splicing isoforms have been identified in humans (hRenalase1 to hRenalase4). Only hRenalase1 is detected in human blood samples, which means that hRenalase2 to 4 probably have different functions than hRenalase1.

Analysis of the primary structure of renalase shows that it is an FAD-dependent oxidase. The X-ray crystal structure of hRenalase1 reveals structural similarity between renalase and p-hydroxybenzoate hydroxylase.

== Function ==
Renalase has been claimed to degrade catecholamines like adrenaline (epinephrine) and noradrenaline (norepinephrine) in the blood circulation. Dr. Gary Desir's laboratory at Yale School of Medicine discovered and named renalase in 2005 suggest that the human kidney releases this protein into the bloodstream to regulate blood pressure (in addition to other possible, as yet undiscovered, functions).

Whether renalase actually oxidizes catecholamine substrates has been widely disputed. The primary evidence for catecholamine oxidation is the detection of H_{2}O_{2}, however catecholamines emanate H_{2}O_{2} in the presence of O_{2} in a natural decomposition reaction. In 2013, renalase was claimed to oxidize α-NADH (the normal form of NADH is the β anomer) to β-NAD^{+}, with concomitant reduction of O_{2} (dioxygen) to H_{2}O_{2} (hydrogen peroxide). This reaction was proposed to repair aberrant NADH and NADPH forms that are not accepted as cofactors by most nicotinamide-dependent oxidoreductase enzymes.

It transpired that α-NAD(P)H molecules are not substrates for renalase; instead 6-dihydroNAD (6DHNAD) was identified as the substrate, a molecule with highly similar spectrophotometric characteristics and equilibrium concentrations as those reported for α-NAD(P)H. 6DHNAD is an isomeric form of β-NADH that carries the hydride in the 6-position of the nicotinamide base as opposed to the metabolically active 4-position. This form of NAD is one of three products that are formed from non-enzymatic reduction of β-NAD^{+} in addition to 4-dihydroNAD (β-NADH), 2-dihydroNAD (2DHNAD). Both 2DHNAD and 6DHNAD were shown to be substrates for renalase. These molecules react rapidly to reduce the enzyme's flavin cofactor forming β-NAD^{+}. The renalase flavin then delivers the electrons harvested to O_{2} (dioxygen) forming H_{2}O_{2} (hydrogen peroxide), completing the catalytic cycle. It was shown that both 6DHNAD and 2DHNAD are tight binding inhibitors of specific primary metabolism dehydrogenases, thereby defining a clear metabolic function for renalase in the alleviation of this inhibition.

Extracellular renalase functions as a survival and growth factor, independent of its enzymatic activity. Either naturally folded renalase or a 20 amino acid renalase peptide can activate the phosphoinositide 3-kinase (PI3K)and the mitogen-activated protein kinase (MAPK) pathways in a manner that protects cells against apoptosis.

== Catalysis ==
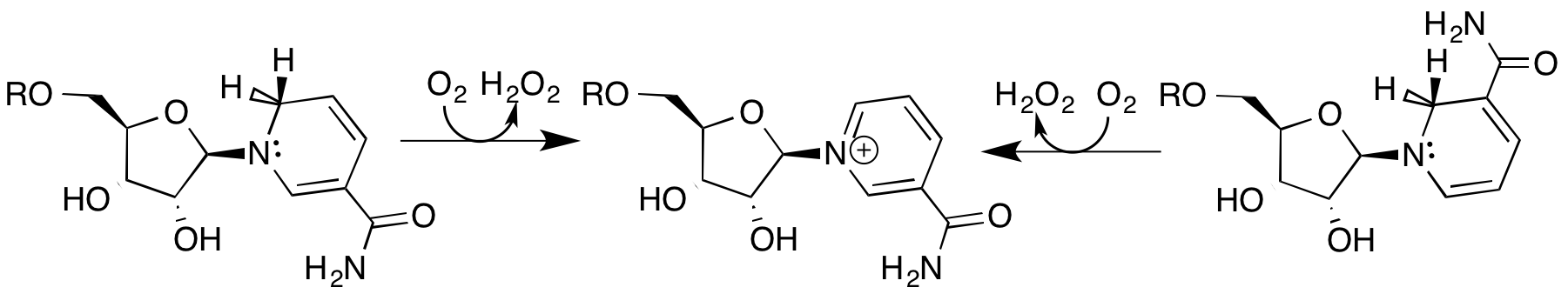
Renalase converts either 6-dihydro-NAD(P)H (left) or 2-dihydro-NAD(P)H (right) to NAD(P)+.

Renalase isolated in native form, that is, without refolding steps, catalyzes the oxidation of 6DHNAD(P) or 2DHNAD(P), the isomeric forms of β-NAD(P)H. In contrast to clear evidence for catalysis of this activity, the native renalase used in these experiments did not catalyze the conversion of the catecholamine epinephrine to adrenochrome.

Renalase is secreted in plasma, and functions as an anti-apoptotic survival factor. The Plasma membrane Ca2+ ATPase PMCA4b is a putative receptor for extracellular renalase. The binding of renalase to PMCA4b stimulates calcium efflux with subsequent activation of the PI3K and MAPK pathways, increased expression of the anti-apoptotic factor Bcl-2, and decreased caspase3-mediated apoptosis. Administration of recombinant renalase protects against acute kidney injury (AKI), and against cardiac ischemia in animal models.

== Clinical significance ==
Renalase levels are markedly reduced in patients with severe chronic kidney disease (end-stage renal disease, ESRD). Since hormones like erythropoietin are secreted less in ESRD, renalase may also be a kidney hormone, although it is also expressed in heart muscle, skeletal muscle and liver cells in humans, and in mouse testicles.

Renalase has been controversially proposed to degrade catecholamines, which are hormones involved in the acute stress (fight-or-flight) response. Injection of renalase in rodents transiently decreases blood pressure, heart rate, heart muscle contractility, and blood vessel resistance. Under normal conditions, renalase is present but inactive in the bloodstream. When catecholamines are released into the bloodstream however, renalase activity increases about tenfold within 30 seconds, and remains high for an hour or longer. Activation of circulating renalase is probably responsible for early activation, while secretion into the bloodstream occurs after 15 minutes.

polymorphisms in the renalase gene is a risk factor for essential hypertension.

Single nucleotide polymorphisms in the renalase gene are associated with type 1 diabetes. A genome-wide association study and meta-analysis found that approximately 42 loci affect the risk of diabetes The data confirmed linkage with most of the 24 previously identified loci, and identified 27 novel loci. The strongest evidence of association among these novel regions was achieved for the renalase gene.

== Animal studies ==
In mice, hearts exposed to oxygen shortage (ischemia), myocardial infarction size was decreased and heart function better preserved when renalase was administered. Renalase knock-out mice are also more sensitive to damage to the heart muscle. Renalase expression in the heart is also decreased in the rat model of end-stage renal disease. The scientists who discovered renalase believe that it might explain some of the susceptibility to heart disease among patients with chronic kidney disease.

Using small inhibitory RNAs or knock-out mice, the consequences of loss of renalase function have been studied. These include raised blood pressure (hypertension), increased heart rate (tachycardia), increased blood vessel resistance (vasoconstriction) and an increased catecholamine response.

In a rat model of chronic kidney disease (in which 85% of kidney tissue is surgically removed), renalase deficiency and defective renalase activation develops 2–3 weeks after surgery.

== Interactions ==
Renalase has been shown to interact with PMCA4b.
