= Stepholidine =

(−)-Stepholidine

Names
- IUPAC name 3,9-Dimethoxyberbine-2,10-diol
- Systematic IUPAC name (13aS)-3,9-Dimethoxy-5,8,13,13a-tetrahydro-6H-isoquinolino[3,2-a]isoquinoline-2,10-diol
- Other names l-Stepholidine

Identifiers
CAS Number	16562-13-3
3D model (JSmol)	Interactive image
ChEMBL	ChEMBL487387
ChemSpider	5293188
MeSH	Stepholidine
PubChem CID	6917970
UNII	0UPX3E69W8
CompTox Dashboard (EPA)	DTXSID70937112
- InChI: InChI=1S/C19H21NO4/c1-23-18-8-12-5-6-20-10-14-11(3-4-16(21)19(14)24-2)7-15(20)13(12)9-17(18)22/h3-4,8-9,15,21-22H,5-7,10H2,1-2H3/t15-/m0/s1 Key: JKPISQIIWUONPB-HNNXBMFYSA-N; InChI=1/C19H21NO4/c1-23-18-8-12-5-6-20-10-14-11(3-4-16(21)19(14)24-2)7-15(20)13(12)9-17(18)22/h3-4,8-9,15,21-22H,5-7,10H2,1-2H3/t15-/m0/s1 Key: JKPISQIIWUONPB-HNNXBMFYBD
- SMILES: COC1=C(C=C2[C@@H]3CC4=C(CN3CCC2=C1)C(=C(C=C4)O)OC)O

Properties
Chemical formula	C_{19}H_{21}NO_{4}
Molar mass	327.374 g/mol
- Except where otherwise noted, data are given for materials in their standard state (at 25 °C [77 °F], 100 kPa). verify (what is ?) Infobox references

(−)-Stepholidine is a protoberberine alkaloid found in the plant Stephania intermedia.

Stepholidine activity includes dual D_{2} receptor antagonist and D_{1} receptor agonist, and has shown antipsychotic activity in animal studies.

== See also ==
- Apomorphine
- Bulbocapnine
- Glaucine
- Nuciferine
- Pukateine
- Tetrahydropalmatine
