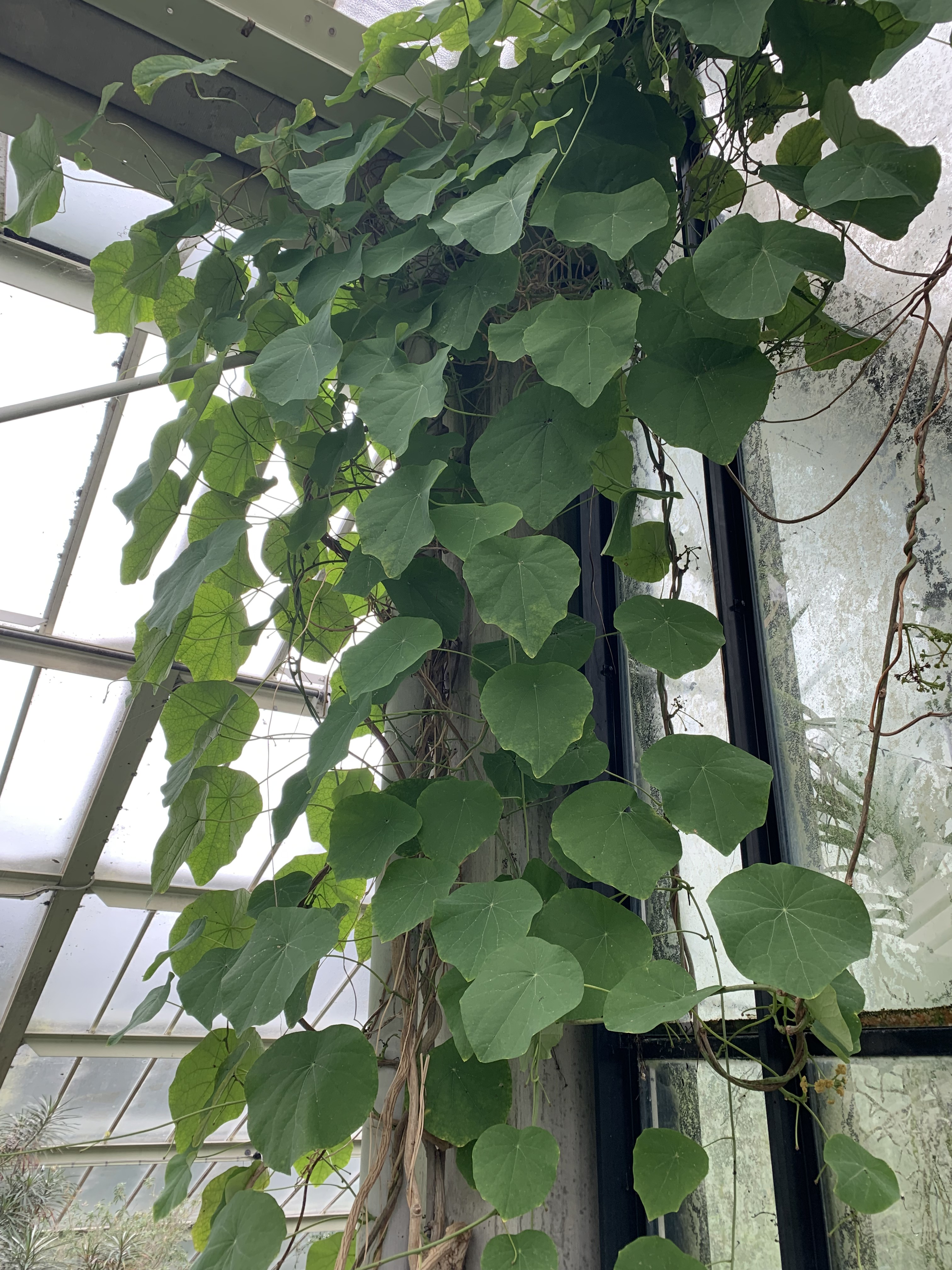
- Stephania rotunda Lour. cultivated at Royal Botanic Gardens, Kew.

Scientific classification
- Kingdom: Plantae
- Clade: Embryophytes
- Clade: Tracheophytes
- Clade: Spermatophytes
- Clade: Angiosperms
- Clade: Eudicots
- Order: Ranunculales
- Family: Menispermaceae
- Genus: Stephania
- Species: S. rotunda

Binomial name
- Stephania rotunda (Dill. & A. Rich.) Walp.

= Stephania rotunda =

Species of flowering plant

Stephania rotunda is a species of vine native to the Indian subcontinent, from Southern Tibet to Indo-China. It is a climbing tuberous geophyte that grows primarily in wet tropical biomes.
