= Atherosperminine =

Clinical data
- Other names: Atherospermine
- Drug class: Dopamine receptor agonist
- ATC code: None

Identifiers
- IUPAC name: 2-(3,4-dimethoxyphenanthren-1-yl)-N,N-dimethylethanamine
- CAS Number: 5531-98-6
- PubChem CID: 96918
- ChemSpider: 87510
- UNII: QV2JRL6MCM
- ChEBI: CHEBI:174220
- ChEMBL: ChEMBL1186488
- CompTox Dashboard (EPA): DTXSID30970641

Chemical and physical data
- Formula: C_{20}H_{23}NO_{2}
- Molar mass: 309.409 g·mol^{−1}
- 3D model (JSmol): Interactive image
- SMILES: CN(C)CCC1=CC(=C(C2=C1C=CC3=CC=CC=C32)OC)OC
- InChI: InChI=1S/C20H23NO2/c1-21(2)12-11-15-13-18(22-3)20(23-4)19-16-8-6-5-7-14(16)9-10-17(15)19/h5-10,13H,11-12H2,1-4H3; Key:UZZFAUDNCIFFPM-UHFFFAOYSA-N

Atherosperminine, or atherospermine, is a dopamine receptor agonist, alkaloid found in Fissistigma glaucescens and other species, and the Hofmann degradation product of the aporphine alkaloid and dopamine receptor antagonist nuciferine. It is a catecholamine with an expanded phenanthrene ring system and contains the neurotransmitter dopamine within its chemical structure. The drug produces effects in rodents including hyperlocomotion, stereotypy, augmentation of amphetamine-induced toxicity, and reversal of haloperidol-induced catalepsy, among others. Its effects are largely opposite to those of nuciferine, which instead shows antipsychotic-like effects. In addition to its dopamine receptor agonism, atherosperminine has also shown other actions and effects, such as phosphodiesterase inhibition.

== See also ==
- Phenanthrene
- Catecholamine
- Nuciferine
- AMDA
