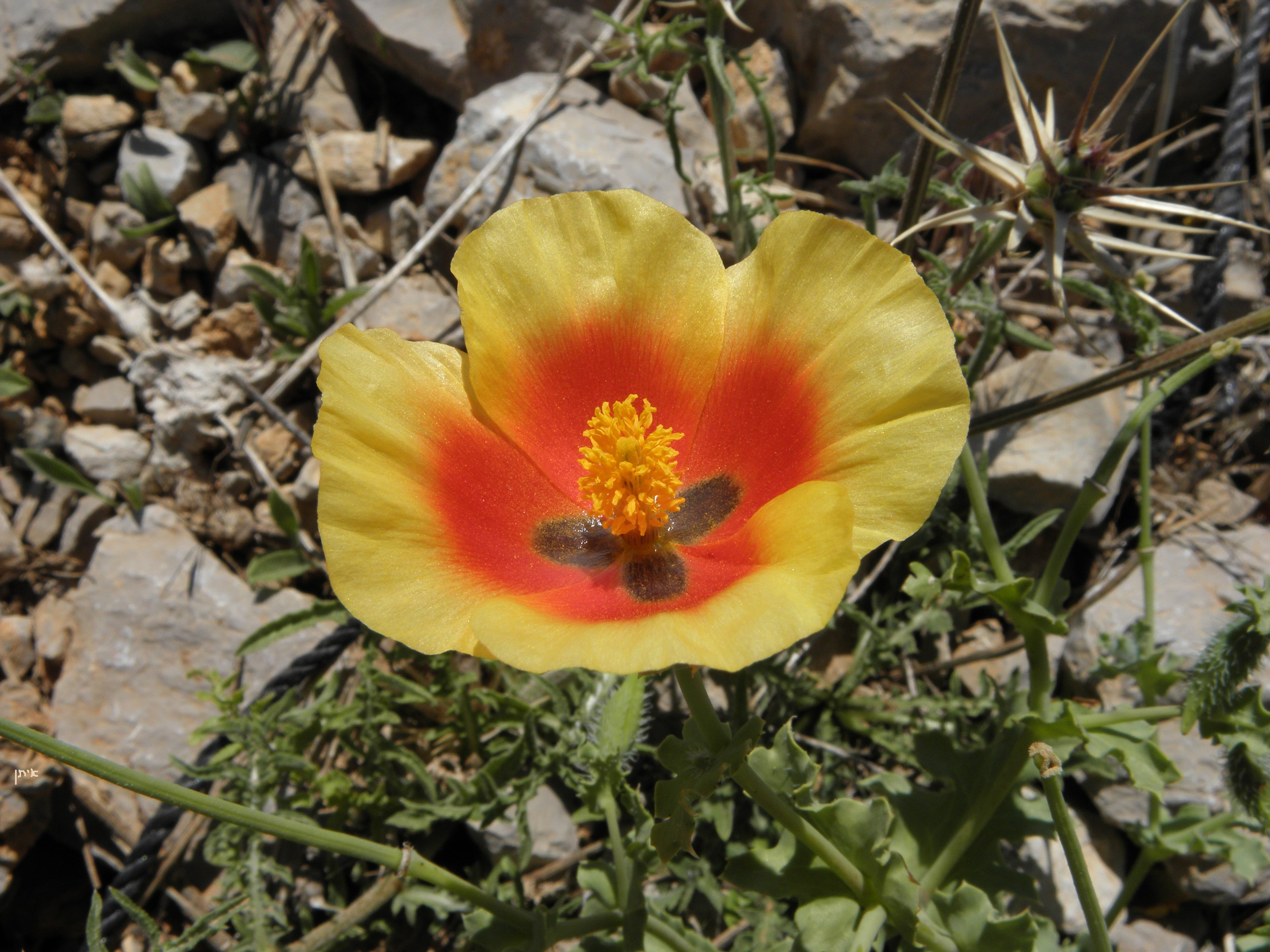

Scientific classification
- Kingdom: Plantae
- Clade: Tracheophytes
- Clade: Angiosperms
- Clade: Eudicots
- Order: Ranunculales
- Family: Papaveraceae
- Genus: Glaucium
- Species: G. secmenii

Binomial name
- Glaucium secmenii Boiss. & Buhse

Synonyms
- G. elegantissimum Mobayen; G. golestanicum A.Gran & Sharifnia; G. oxylobum var. paucilobatum (Freyn) Parsa; G. oxylobum subsp. rechingeri Mory; G. paucilobatum Freyn; G. pulchrum Stapf

= Glaucium oxylobum =

Species of horned poppy

Glaucium oxylobum, called Lotus sweetjuice, is a species of flowering plant in the horned poppy genus which is native to Afghanistan, Iran, Turkmenistan, and Uzbekistan. It was originally described by Pierre Edmond Boissier and Friedrich Alexander Buhse in 1860 in the 12th volume of the Nouveaux mémoires de la Société impériale des naturalistes de Moscou.
