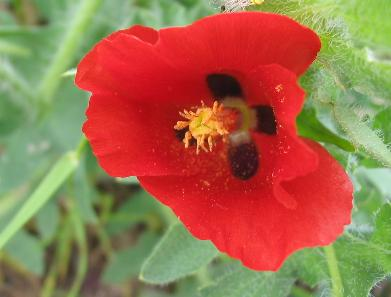

Scientific classification
- Kingdom: Plantae
- Clade: Embryophytes
- Clade: Tracheophytes
- Clade: Spermatophytes
- Clade: Angiosperms
- Clade: Eudicots
- Order: Ranunculales
- Family: Papaveraceae
- Genus: Glaucium
- Species: G. corniculatum

Binomial name
- Glaucium corniculatum (L.) Curtis

Synonyms
- Glaucium phoenicum Crantz

= Glaucium corniculatum =

Species of flowering plant

Glaucium corniculatum, the blackspot hornpoppy or red horned-poppy, is a species of the genus Glaucium in the poppy family (Papaveraceae). It is an annual flowering plant, occurring in southern Europe, and grows up to 1 foot (30 cm) high. The stem and leaves are hairy, the capsule fruit is covered with stiff hair, the flower is red, with a black spot on the base of the tepal bract, which has a yellow margin around it. The flower appears from June until August.
