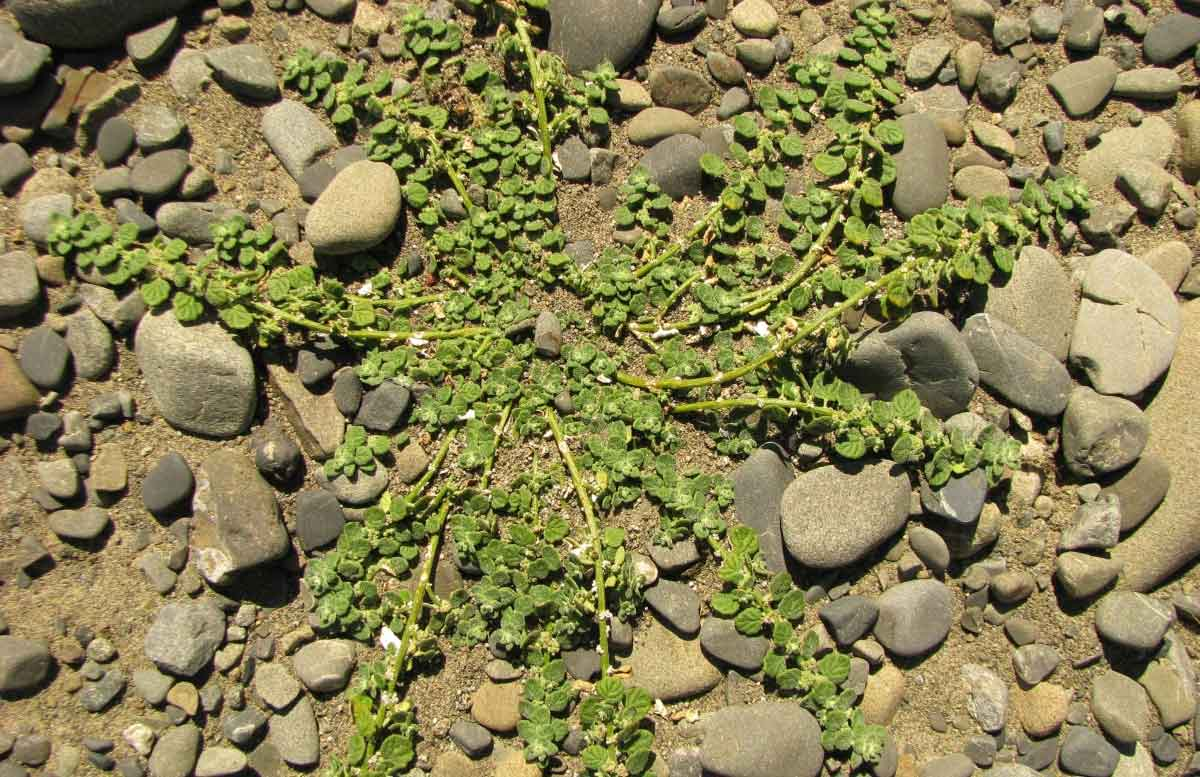

Conservation status
- Nationally Endangered (NZ TCS)

Scientific classification
- Kingdom: Plantae
- Clade: Tracheophytes
- Clade: Angiosperms
- Clade: Eudicots
- Order: Caryophyllales
- Family: Amaranthaceae
- Genus: Dysphania
- Species: D. pusilla

Binomial name
- Dysphania pusilla Mosyakin & Clemants

Synonyms
- Chenopodium pusillum Hook.f.

= Dysphania pusilla =

Species of flowering plant

Dysphania pusilla, formerly Chenopodium pusillum, otherwise known as pygmy goosefoot or parahia in Māori, is a prostrate herb endemic to the north-eastern parts of South Island, New Zealand. Presumed extinct after 56 years without recorded observations, the species was rediscovered in 2015.

== Description ==
Dysphania pusilla is an annual, puberulent herb, growing to around 20 centimetres (8 in) in length and often forming a cushion-like covering on surfaces such as clay and rocks. The herb is distinguishable from other species of the genus (such as the introduced Dysphania pumilio) through the slightly smaller seeds, a different number of tepals and the close positioning of the leaves in relation to each other. The herb, existing in both green and brown colour morphs, produces small green and yellow flowers during the warmer months.

== Etymology ==
The name is derived from the term pusilla, which is the Latin word for 'very small'.

== Location ==
Dysphania pusilla, a New Zealand endemic, is generally located in the north-eastern corner of the South Island of New Zealand; Harry Allan in his Flora of New Zealand (1961) mentions that it does not grow south of 43°30'S. The plant is usually found in dry, sparsely-vegetated open spaces, including ephemeral wetlands, but has also been known to bloom in urban environments such as railway yards and agricultural land.

== History ==
The plant was first recorded in 1864 as Chenopodium pusillum by Joseph Dalton Hooker in his systematic work Handbook of the New Zealand Flora. Missionary Richard Taylor in his book Te Ika a Maui: or, New Zealand and its inhabitants (1855) had recorded the Māori proverb

Tena te ringa tango parahia.

— Māori proverb
Translation:

That is a hand which roots out the parahia.

— Richard Taylor's translation

explaining that "This saying is applied to a diligent husbandman. The parahia is a diminutive kind of spinach, which overruns their cultivations." Parahia was identified as Ctenopodium pusillum by botanist William Colenso in a paper presented to the Hawke's Bay Philosophical Institute on 9 June 1879. In 2008, botanists Sergei Leonidovich Mosyakin and Steven Earl Clemants re-allocated this taxon to the genus Dysphania.

The plant was prevalent until 1959, when the last known sample was located beside a railway siding in Christchurch, and although Colenso had described it as abundant in Maori cultivations, it got no mention in any lists of indigenous "weeds" affecting agriculture or horticulture, and was by 1999 considered data deficient. In 2012, "following repeated surveys in known or expected habitats at appropriate times", Dysphania pusilla was considered extinct.

Botanist Shannel Courtney, Department of Conservation's Technical Support Officer for Flora and Restoration and the 2008 Loder Cup recipient, stumbled upon a widespread growth of the species near a tributary of the Waiau Toa / Clarence River in January 2015, followed by reports of other specimens found in the Ruataniwha wetlands in the McKenzie Basin, and a third discovery in March in the Heron Basin in mid-Canterbury. Botanists speculate that seeds of D. pusilla lie dormant for decades awaiting suitable growing conditions. The plant is still threatened by habitat loss to date, due to introduced species and changes in land use for agricultural purposes and cattle grazing. Thus, in both 2017 and 2018, it was declared "Threatened - Nationally Endangered".
