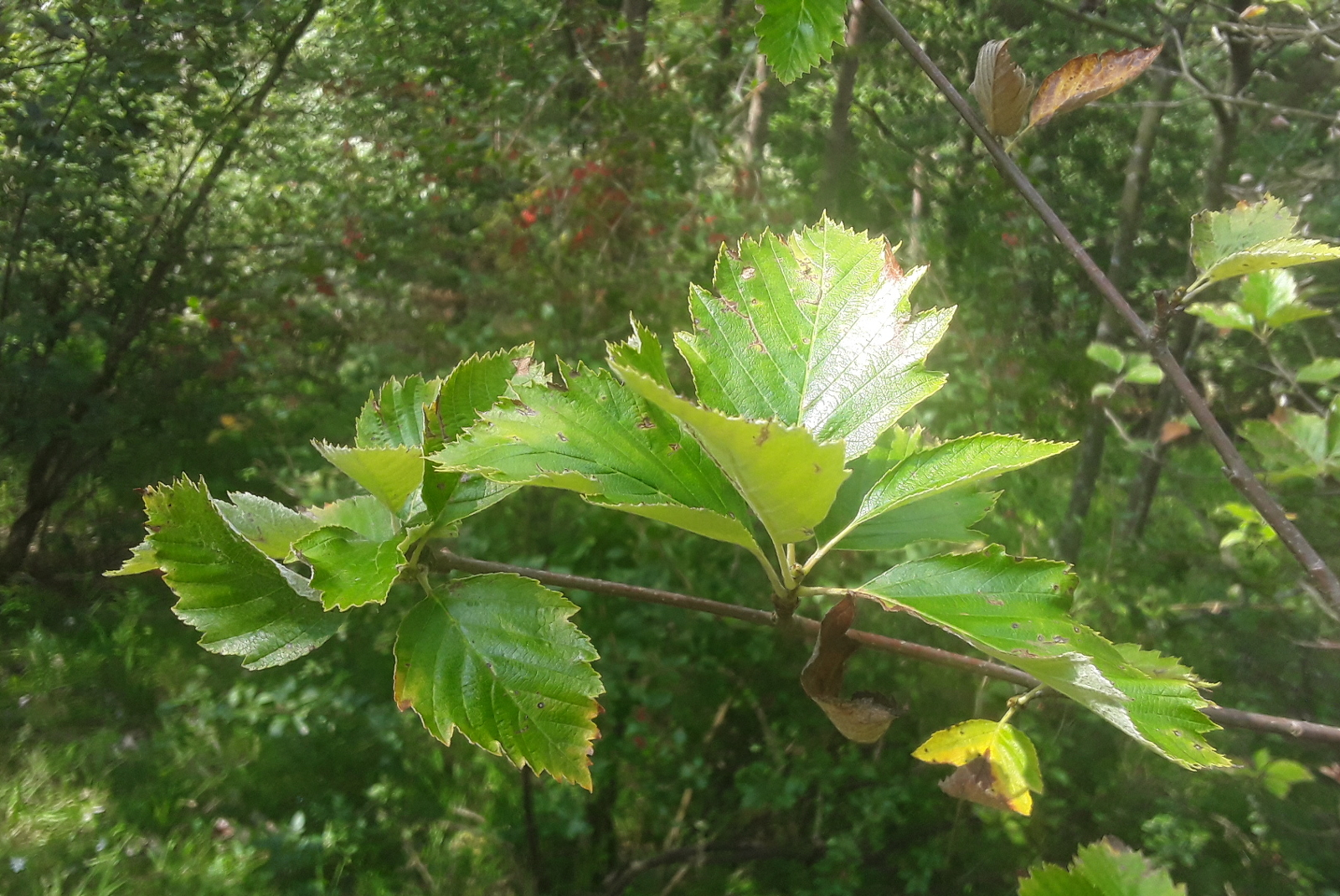
- Aria mergenthaleriana foliage

Conservation status
- Critically Endangered (IUCN 3.1)

Scientific classification
- Kingdom: Plantae
- Clade: Tracheophytes
- Clade: Angiosperms
- Clade: Eudicots
- Clade: Rosids
- Order: Rosales
- Family: Rosaceae
- Genus: Aria
- Species: A. mergenthaleriana

Binomial name
- Aria mergenthaleriana (N.Mey.) Mosyakin, Fedor. & McNeill
- It is endemic to Bavaria, Germany

Synonyms
- Karpatiosorbus mergenthaleriana (N.Mey.) Sennikov & Kurtto; Pyrus mergenthaleriana (N.Mey.) M.F.Fay & Christenh.; Sorbus mergenthaleriana N.Mey.

= Aria mergenthaleriana =

Species of tree

Aria mergenthaleriana, or Mergenthaler's whitebeam, is an apomictic species of tree in the family Rosaceae endemic to Bavaria, Germany. It is extremely rare and threatened with extinction.

== Description ==
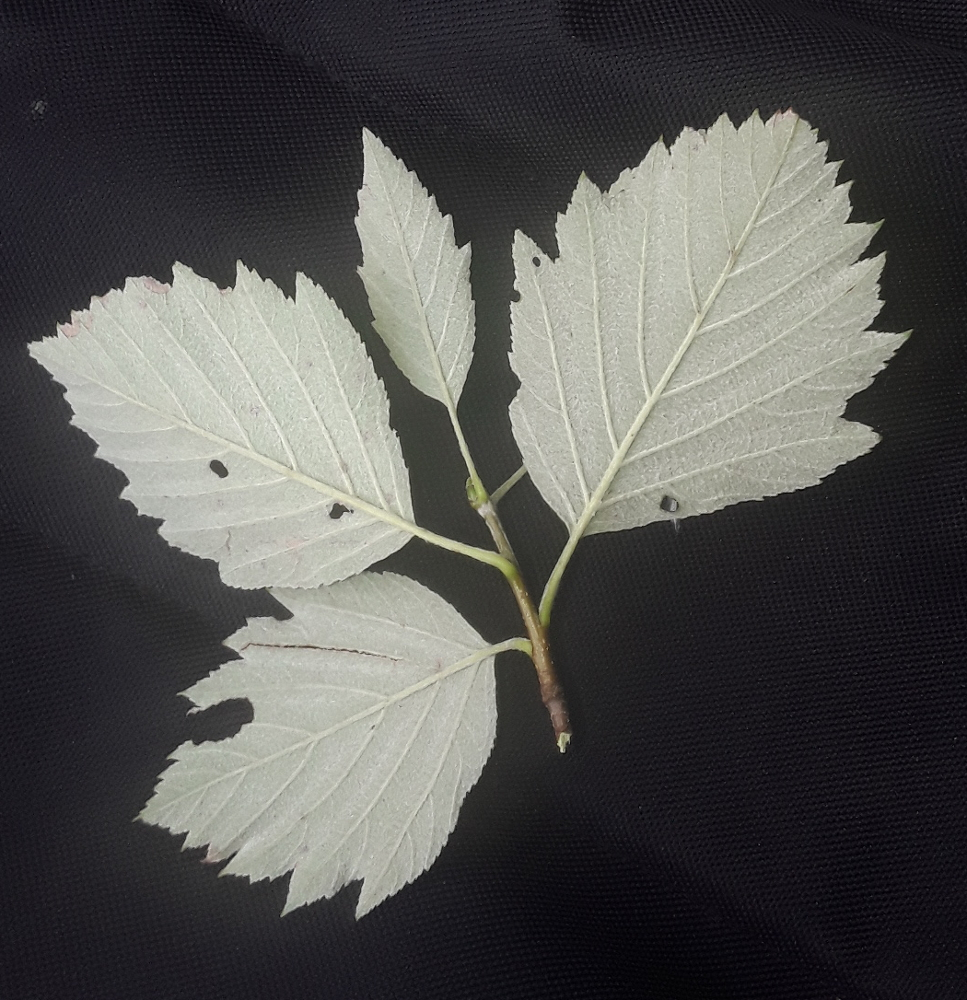
Abaxial surface of Aria mergenthaleriana leaves

=== Vegetative characteristics ===
Aria mergenthaleriana is an up to 4–5 m tall shrub or tree. The ovate leaves of the short twigs are 6–7 cm long and those of the long twigs are 7–9 cm long. The leaves have 10–11 pairs of lateral veins. The abaxial leaf surface is pubescent with grey hairs. The petiole is 1.5–2.3 cm long. The autumn leaves have a pure yellow colouration.

=== Generative characteristics ===
The flowers have two basally fused styles. The anthers are cream-coloured. The ovoid, bright or dark orange accessory fruits with 0.5 mm big lenticels are up to 17 mm long.

=== Cytology ===
The chromosome count is 2n = 3x = 51. It is triploid.

== Taxonomy ==
It was first described as Sorbus mergenthaleriana N.Mey. by Norbert Meyer in 2005. It was moved to the genus Aria (Pers.) J.Jacq. ex Host as Aria mergenthaleriana (N.Mey.) Mosyakin, Fedor. & McNeill by Sergei Leonidovich Mosyakin, Mykola Mykhaylovych Fedoronchuk, and John McNeill in 2025. The type specimen was collected on the 1st of July 2001 by N. Meyer and O. Angerer near Etterzhausen.

=== Etymology ===
The specific epithet mergenthaleriana honours the German botanist Otto Mergenthaler.

== Distribution and habitat ==
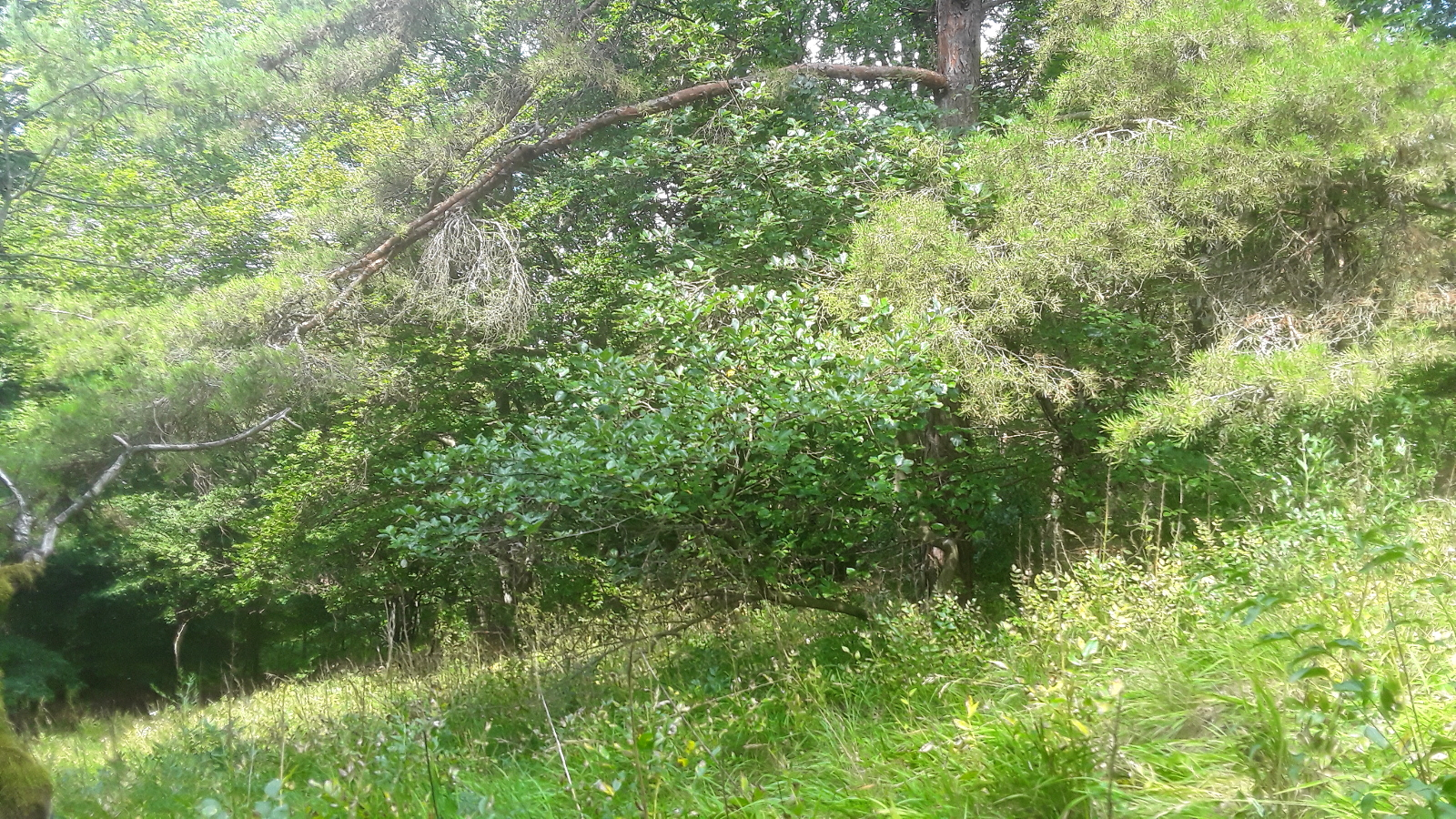
Aria mergenthaleriana growing in the Naab valley

Aria mergenthaleriana is endemic a small area of only about 6.6 km^{2} near Regensburg, Germany, where it occurs in disused pastures now afforested with pine trees, on the edges of deciduous forest, and on rocks at elevations of 350–400 m above sea level.

== Conservation ==
It is cultivated in ex situ conservation collections in several botanic gardens, including the Zoological and Botanical Garden of the City Plzeň, the Botanischer Garten der Universität Regensburg, and the Rogów Arboretum of Warsaw University of Life Sciences.
