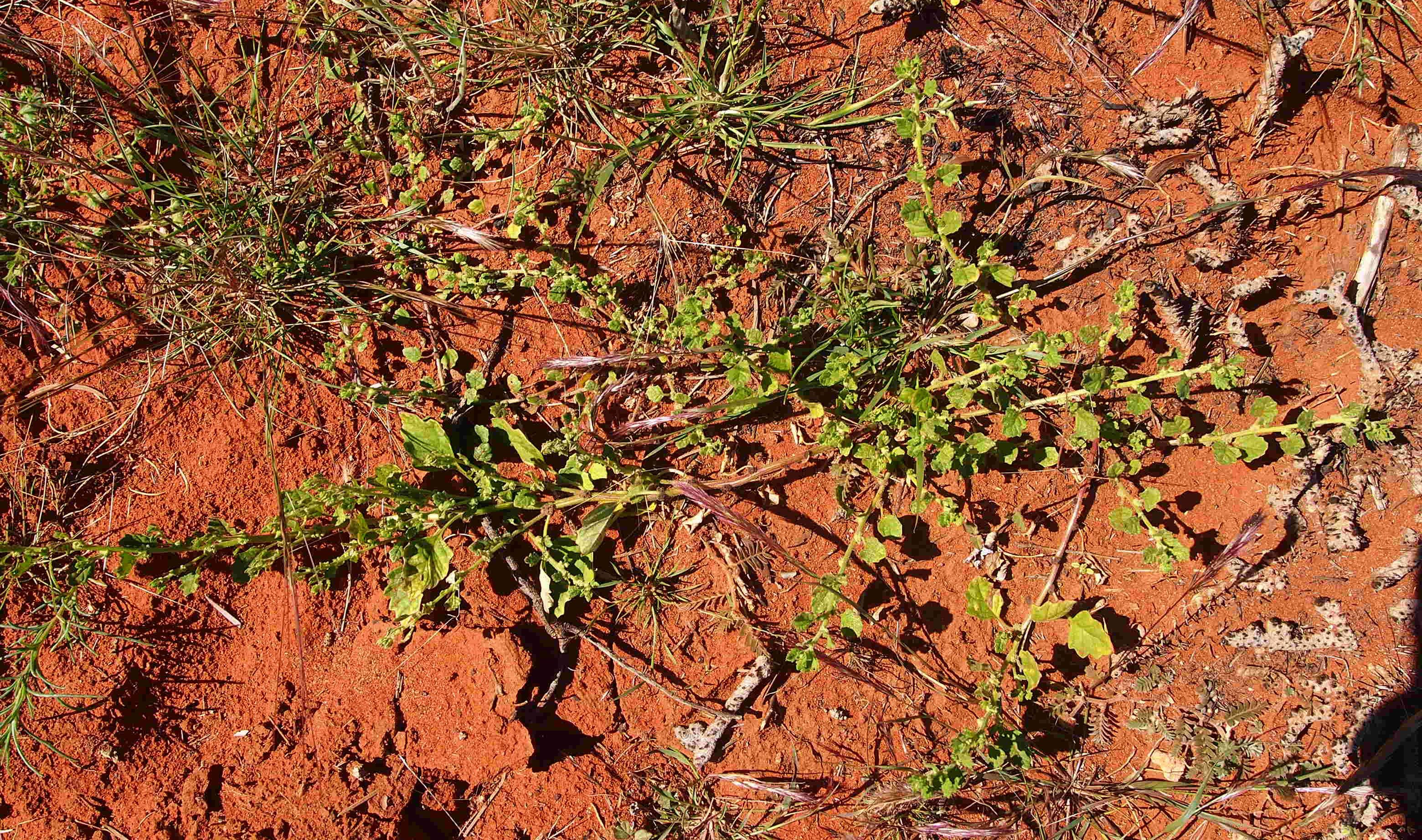

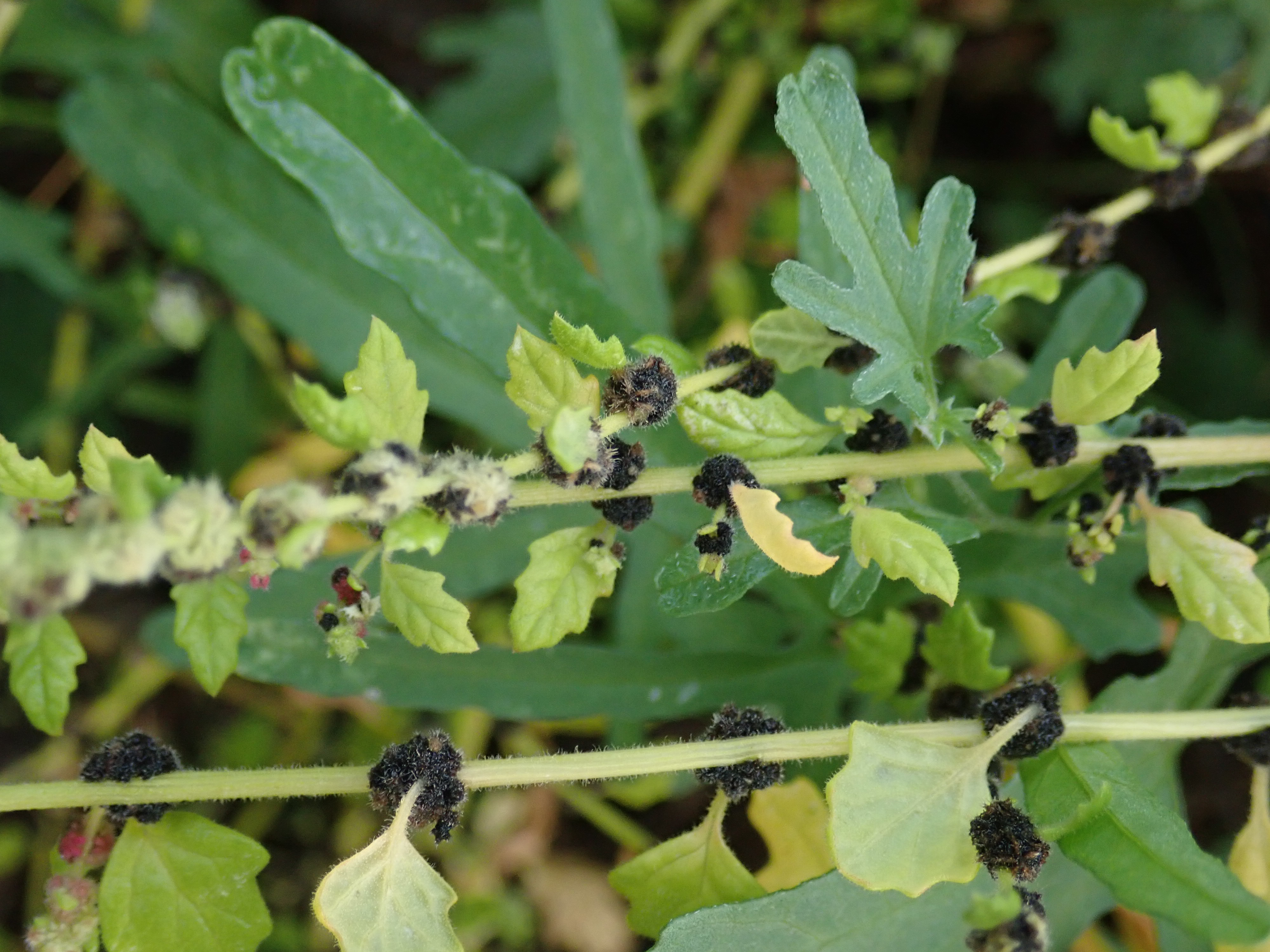

Scientific classification
- Kingdom: Plantae
- Clade: Tracheophytes
- Clade: Angiosperms
- Clade: Eudicots
- Order: Caryophyllales
- Family: Amaranthaceae
- Genus: Dysphania
- Species: D. melanocarpa

Binomial name
- Dysphania melanocarpa (J.M.Black) Mosyakin & Clemants

Synonyms
- Chenopodium melanocarpum Chenopodium carinatum var. melanocarpum

= Dysphania melanocarpa =

Species of plant

Dysphania melanocarpa, commonly known as black crumbweed, is an annual herb that grows in arid and semi-arid regions of Australia.

== Description ==
It grows as a prostrate aromatic annual, with hairy stems that branch from its base. Leaves are oval in shape, about fifteen millimetres long. Flowers occur in dense clusters located in the axils.

== Taxonomy ==
It was first published in 1922 by John McConnell Black, as a variety of C. carinatum, and promoted to species rank by him in 1934. Two forms have been published, although these are only recognised in South Australia and Western Australia; they are C. melanocarpum f. melanocarpum and C. melanocarpum f. leucocarpum. In 2008, Sergei L. Mosyakin & Steven E. Clemants grouped this taxon in genus Dysphania.

== Distribution and habitat ==
It occurs in arid and semi-arid areas of Australia, usually in well-drained soils.
