= Aria omissa =

Conservation status
- Endangered (IUCN 3.1)

Scientific classification
- Kingdom: Plantae
- Clade: Tracheophytes
- Clade: Angiosperms
- Clade: Eudicots
- Clade: Rosids
- Order: Rosales
- Family: Rosaceae
- Genus: Aria
- Species: A. omissa

Binomial name
- Aria omissa (Velebil) Mosyakin, Fedor. & McNeill
- It is endemic to the Czech Republic

Synonyms
- Karpatiosorbus omissa (Velebil) Sennikov & Kurtto; Pyrus velebilii M.F.Fay & Christenh.; Sorbus omissa Velebil

Species of tree in the family Rosaceae

Aria omissa is an apomictic species of tree in the family Rosaceae endemic to the Czech Republic. It is an endangered species.

== Description ==
=== Vegetative characteristics ===
Aria omissa is a deciduous, up to 12 m tall, 1–2-trunked tree or shrub with alternate leaves and up to 30 cm wide trunks with grey bark bearing 5–8 mm long, and 5–6 mm wide lenticels. The young bark is smooth, but it later becomes fissured, with vertical fissures appearing especially on the trunk and the base of the branches. The lenticellate twigs are brownish-grey and the young, sparsely tomentose shoots are brown, but become glabrescent at maturity. The ovoid to turbinate, 7–14 mm long, and 3–6 mm wide buds have green scales with sparsely tomentose margins. The simple, broadly elliptical to rhomboidal, flat, lobed, glossy, 8.2–9.5 cm long, and 6.1–7.4 cm wide leaves with a biserrate margin have 9–11 lateral veins. The almost glabrous adaxial leaf surface is pale green to dark green, and the tomentose abaxial leaf surface is yellowish-grey. The triangular apex is acute and the base is cuneate or rarely rounded and partly serrate. The serrate or biserrate lobes are acute or acuminate. The tomentose petiole is 1.7–2.1 cm long.

=== Generative characteristics ===
The abundant, compact, convex, 7–9 cm wide inflorescence with tomentose branchelets bears 46–68 white, actinomorphic flowers. The triangular, acuminate or acute, tomentose, persistent sepals are 2.9–3.5 mm long, and 2.0–2.3 mm wide. The white, ovate to elliptical, concave, clawed petals are 5.8–6.3 mm long, and 4.3–4.6 mm wide. The 20 stamens with whitish filaments have pale yellow, 1.1–1.2 mm long anthers. The ovary is semi-inferior. The 2 partially fused, basally pubescent, crooked, greenish-cream-coloured styles are 4.0–4.5 mm long. The greenish-cream-coloured, flat stigma is 0.5–0.6 mm wide. The glossy, subglobose to obovoid, orange to orange-red, glabrous or glabrescent, 12–13 mm long, and 11–12 mm wide fruit bears numerous lenticels. The seeds are greyish-brown. Flowering occurs in May.

=== Cytology ===
The chromosome count is 2n = 3x = 51. It is triploid.

== Taxonomy ==
It was first described as Sorbus omissa Velebil by Jiří Velebil in 2012. It was moved to the genus Aria (Pers.) J.Jacq. ex Host as Aria omissa (Velebil) Mosyakin, Fedor. & McNeill by Sergei Leonidovich Mosyakin, Mykola Mykhaylovych Fedoronchuk, and John McNeill in 2025. The type specimen was collected on the 9 May 2011 by J. Velebil in an oak forest on the northeastern slope of Stříbrník Hill, on the left bank of the Vltava River, Prague-West District, Central Bohemia, Czech Republic at an elevation of 250 m. Aria omissa arose via hybridisation involving Aria torminalis and Aria danubialis.

=== Etymology ===
The specific epithet omissa is derived from the Latin omissa meaning omitted, left out, disregarded, or neglected. The name refers to the omission of the species, despite it growing near Prague, the capital of the Czech Republic.

== Distribution and habitat ==
It is endemic to central Bohemia, Czech Republic, where two populations are growing in an area of 8 km^{2} in open oak forests and rocky slopes at elevations of 200–290 m above sea level. It is a light-demanding species that requires open habitats and fails to fruit in shaded conditions under dense forest canopies. The trees are usually found as scattered individuals.

== Conservation ==
Aria omissa is an endangered species with a small population of 135 mature trees. In the national Red List of the Czech Republic from 2017, it is categorised as C1r – critically threatened taxon, rare. It is not protected by law. It is threatened by the overgrowth of its habitats, the closing of forest canopies, high game populations, which prevent natural regeneration, and by the eutrophication of the habitats. A micropropagation protocol has been developed for Aria omissa. It is cultivated in the ex situ conservation collections of the Dendrologická zahrada Průhonice. in the Prague Botanical Garden, in the Arboretum SGGW W Rogowie, and in the Zoological and Botanical Garden of the City Plzen.
