= Aria albensis =

- Fruiting branches of Aria albensis

Conservation status
- Endangered (IUCN 3.1)

Scientific classification
- Kingdom: Plantae
- Clade: Tracheophytes
- Clade: Angiosperms
- Clade: Eudicots
- Clade: Rosids
- Order: Rosales
- Family: Rosaceae
- Genus: Aria
- Species: A. albensis

Binomial name
- Aria albensis (M.Lepší, Boublík, P.Lepší & Vít) Mosyakin, Fedor. & McNeill
- It is endemic to the České Středohoří Mountains in the Czech Republic.

Synonyms
- Karpatiosorbus albensis (M.Lepší, Boublík, P.Lepší & Vít) Sennikov & Kurtto; Pyrus albensis (M.Lepší, Boublík, P.Lepší & Vít) M.F.Fay & Christenh.; Sorbus albensis M.Lepší, Boublík, P.Lepší & Vít

Species of tree in the family Rosaceae

Aria albensis is an apomictic species of tree in the family Rosaceae endemic to the České Středohoří Mountains in the Czech Republic. It is a rare and endangered species.

== Description ==
=== Vegetative characteristics ===
Aria albensis is an often multi-trunked, deciduous, 2–13 m tall tree or shrub with trunks of up to 1 m in circumference with grey, initially smooth, or later vertically fissured bark. The narrowly ovoid to turbinate, 10–14 mm long, and 5.0–6.5 mm wide buds have green scales with brown, sparsely tomentose margins. The ovate or broadly elliptical, leaves with a serrate or doubly serrate margin have a cuneate to rounded base. The yellowish grey-green abaxial leaf surface is tomentose.

=== Generative characteristics ===
The corymbose inflorescence bears white, actinomorphic flowers. The calyx lobes are 2.7–3.4 mm long. the broadly ovate to subrotund, concave, 5.9–6.9 mm long, and 5.0–5.4 mm wide petals are white. The 20 stamens bear anthers with initially pinkish, later pale yellow colouration. The semi-inferior ovary bears at least partially fused styles. The globose, orange-red fruit bears fuscous seeds. It flowers in May.

=== Cytology ===
The chromosome count is 2n = 3x = 51. It is triploid.

== Taxonomy ==
It was first described as Sorbus albensis M.Lepší, Boublík, P.Lepší & Vít by Martin Lepší, Karel Boublík, Petr Lepší, and Petr Vít in 2009. It was moved to the genus Aria (Pers.) J.Jacq. ex Host as Aria albensis (M.Lepší, Boublík, P.Lepší & Vít) Mosyakin, Fedor. & McNeill by Sergei Leonidovich Mosyakin, Mykola Mykhaylovych Fedoronchuk, and John McNeill in 2025. The type specimen was collected on the 22 June 2007 by Martin Lepší and Karel Boublík in the western slope with bushes about 0.7 km north-north-west from the village Knobloška, Litoměřice district, Czech Republic, at an elevation of 290 m above sea level.

=== Etymology ===
The specific epithet albensis is derived from Albis, the Latin name of the Elbe river. Aria albensis occurs in the Elbe valley and its vicinity.

== Distribution and habitat ==
It is endemic to the České Středohoří Mountains, Czech Republic, where it occurs in multiple locations in a small area of 20 km^{2} growing on acidic and basic soils, in open and in shaded areas, oak forest, scree forest, and semi-dry grassland at elevations of 180–540 m above sea level. It usually does not flower or fruit in shaded areas. It grows alongside other Aria species, such as Aria bohemica, Aria danubialis, and Aria torminalis.

== Conservation ==
Aria albensis is an endangered species with a small population of 540 mature trees and 60 saplings. After Aria bohemica, it is the second most abundant endemic whitebeam species in the Czech Republic. Several populations have hundreds of individuals, but in other places it is more scattered or found in smaller populations. In the national Red List from 2017, it is categorised as a rare and endangered taxon, but it is not protected by law. It is cultivated in ix situ conservation collections in botanic gardens, such as in the Dendrologická zahrada Průhonice and in the Zoological and Botanical Garden of the City Plzen.
