= Wu Yao =

Wu Yao may refer to:

- Wu Teh Yao (simplified Chinese: 吴德耀; traditional Chinese: 吳德耀; pinyin: Wú Dé Yào; 1915–1995), an educator and a specialist in Confucianism and political science
- 乌药, wūyào or Lindera aggregate, a plant
