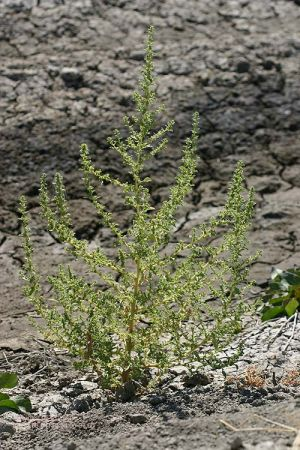

Scientific classification
- Kingdom: Plantae
- Clade: Tracheophytes
- Clade: Angiosperms
- Clade: Eudicots
- Order: Caryophyllales
- Family: Amaranthaceae
- Genus: Dysphania
- Species: D. botrys

Binomial name
- Dysphania botrys (L.) Mosyakin & Clemants

Synonyms
- Chenopodium botrys L.

= Dysphania botrys =

Species of flowering plant

Dysphania botrys (syn. Chenopodium botrys), the Jerusalem oak goosefoot, sticky goosefoot or feathered geranium, is a flowering plant in the genus Dysphania (the glandular goosefoots). It is native to the Mediterranean region.

Jerusalem oak goosefoot was formerly classed in the genus Ambrosia, with the binomial name Ambrosia mexicana. It is naturalised in the United States and Mexico, the old species synonym deriving from the latter.

== Cultivation ==
The plant has a strong scent, reminiscent of stock cubes, and can be used as a flavouring in cooking. It is cultivated as a hardy annual by gardeners.
