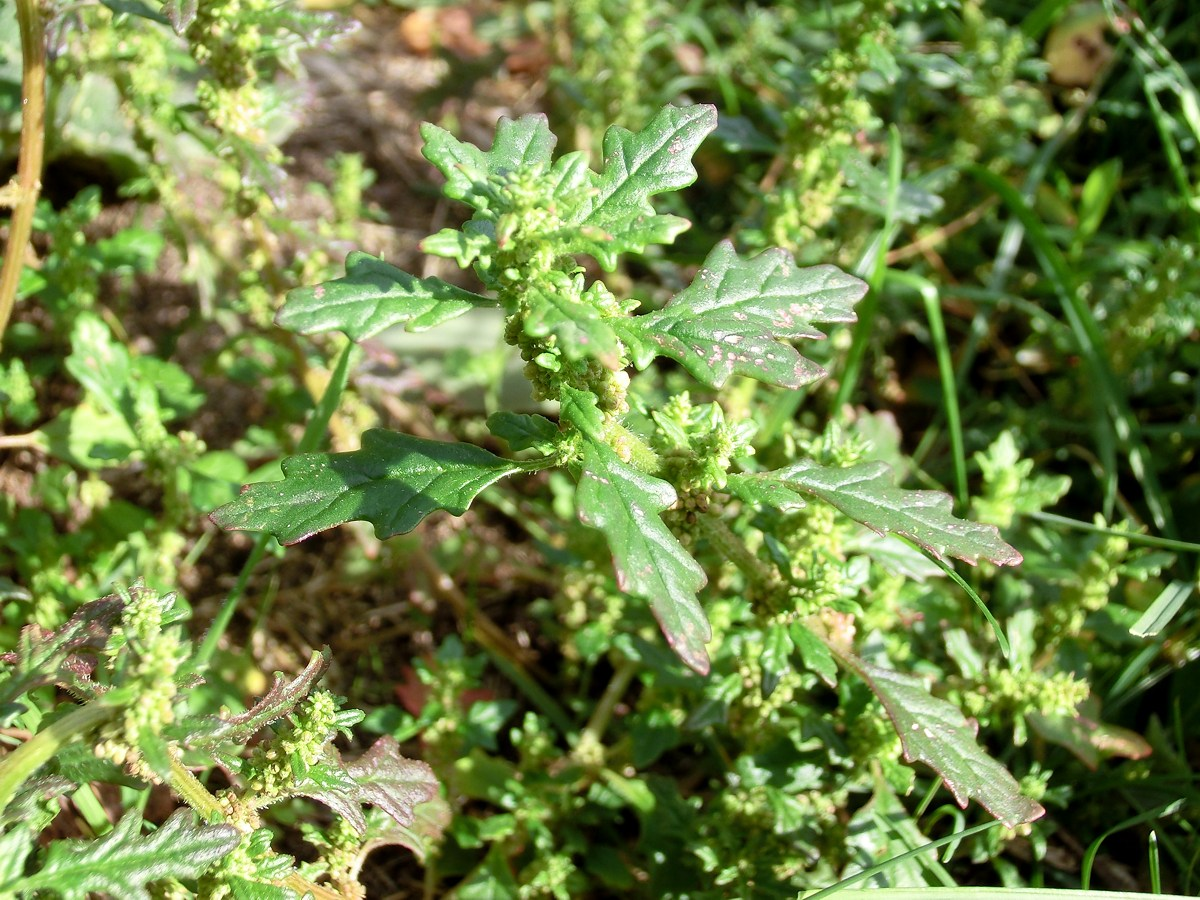

Scientific classification
- Kingdom: Plantae
- Clade: Tracheophytes
- Clade: Angiosperms
- Clade: Eudicots
- Order: Caryophyllales
- Family: Amaranthaceae
- Genus: Dysphania
- Species: D. pumilio

Binomial name
- Dysphania pumilio (R.Br.) Mosyakin & Clemants

Synonyms
- Chenopodium pumilio R.Br. Ambrina pumilio (R.Br.) Moq. Blitum pumilio (R.Br.) Steud. Blitum pumilio (R.Br.) Moq. Teloxys pumilio (R.Br.) W.A.Weber

= Dysphania pumilio =

Species of flowering plant

Dysphania pumilio (common names - small crumbweed, clammy goosefoot) is a species of flowering plant in the family Chenopodioideae.

It is native to Australia, but it is found in other parts of the world as an introduced species, often growing in disturbed and waste areas such as roadsides and lots. It is known from many parts of North America and Europe, and it was recently found in Iran for the first time, in the Māzandarān Province. It is thought to have first arrived in Europe with imports of wool from Australia.

== Taxonomy ==
It was first described in 1810 as Chenopodium pumilio by Robert Brown. It has been ascribed to many genera, but received its current name of Dysphania pumilio in 2002.

== Description ==
This is an aromatic annual herb growing erect, with sticky, glandular stems up to about 25 centimeters tall. The leaves are alternately arranged, up to 2 centimeters long, lance-shaped to oval and edged with bumpy lobes. The surface of the leaf is coated in white sticky glands and sparse hairs. The inflorescence is a spherical cluster of densely packed tiny green flowers located in the leaf axils. Each flower is pebbly with glands and covers the developing fruit.
