= D. graveolens =

D. graveolens may refer to different plant species. The specific epithet graveolens means 'pungent.'

- Diasperus graveolens, a plant in the family Phyllanthaceae
- Dittrichia graveolens, a plant in the family Asteraceae
- Durio graveolens, a red-fleshed durian in the family Malvaceae
- Dysphania graveolens, a plant in the family Amaranthaceae
- Dysphania graveolens, a plant in the family Chenopodiaceae
