= Ascaridole =

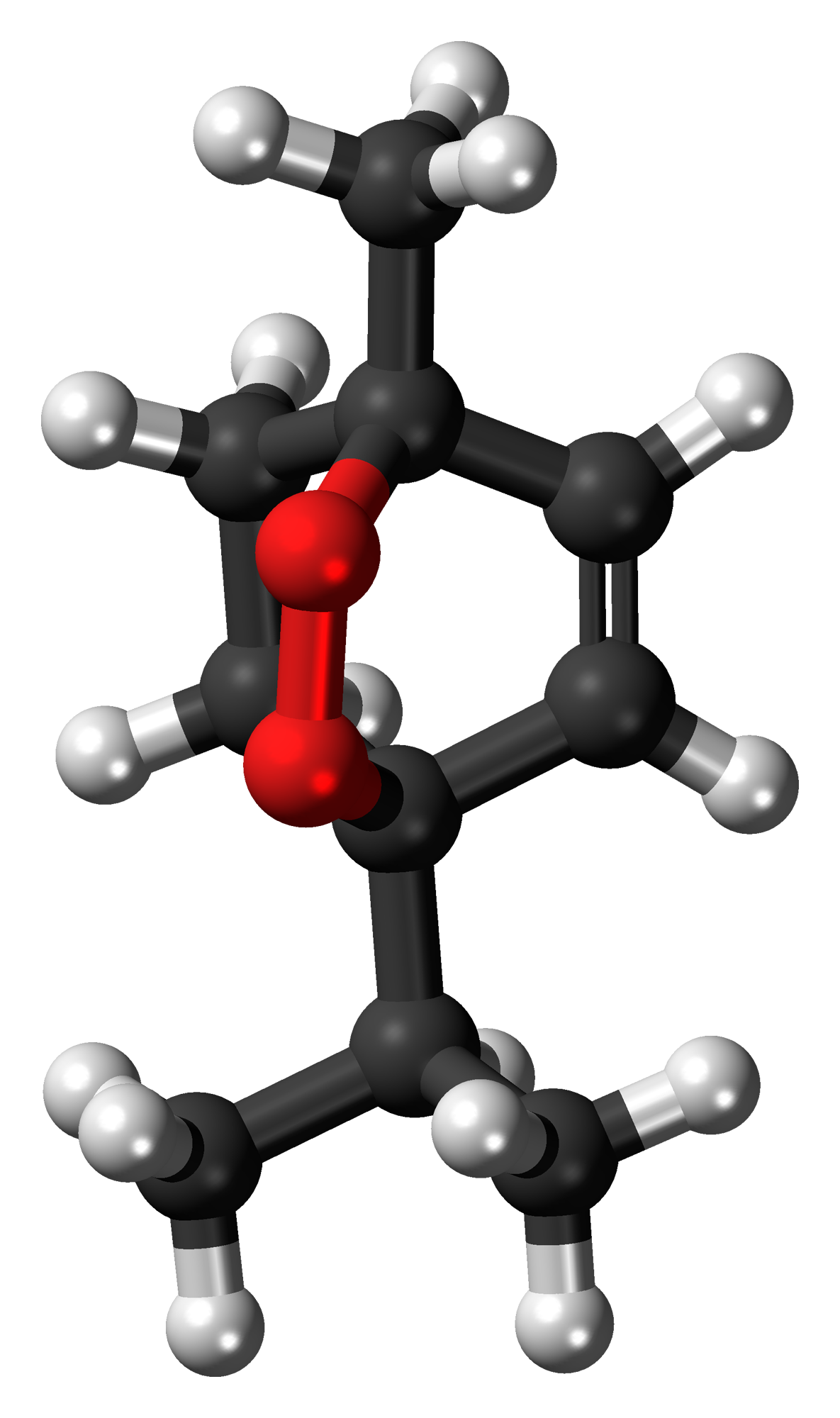

Names
- IUPAC name 1-Methyl-4-(1-methylethyl)-2,3-dioxabicyclo[2.2.2]oct-5-ene

Identifiers
CAS Number	512-85-6
3D model (JSmol)	Interactive image
Beilstein Reference	121382
ChEBI	CHEBI:2866
ChEMBL	ChEMBL467614
ChemSpider	10105
ECHA InfoCard	100.007.408
EC Number	208-147-4
KEGG	C09836
PubChem CID	10545
UNII	1718D0GEVJ
- InChI: InChI=1S/C10H16O2/c1-8(2)10-6-4-9(3,5-7-10)11-12-10/h4,6,8H,5,7H2,1-3H3 Key: MGYMHQJELJYRQS-UHFFFAOYSA-N
- SMILES: O1OC2(\C=C/C1(C)CC2)C(C)C

Properties
Chemical formula	C_{10}H_{16}O_{2}
Molar mass	168.23 g/mol
Appearance	Colorless liquid
Density	1.010 g/cm^{3}
Melting point	3.3 °C (37.9 °F; 276.4 K)
Boiling point	40 °C (104 °F; 313 K) at 0.2 mmHg

Hazards
- GHS labelling
Pictograms	(GHS01: Explosive) (GHS07: Exclamation mark)
Signal word	Danger
- Except where otherwise noted, data are given for materials in their standard state (at 25 °C [77 °F], 100 kPa). verify (what is ?) Infobox references

Ascaridole is a natural organic compound classified as a bicyclic monoterpenoid that has an unusual bridging peroxide functional group. It is a colorless liquid with a pungent smell and taste that is soluble in most organic solvents. Like other low molecular weight organic peroxides, it is unstable and prone to rapid decomposition when heated or treated with organic acids. Ascaridole determines the specific flavor of the Chilean tree boldo and is a major constituent of the oil of Mexican tea (wormseed). It is a component of natural medicine, tonic drinks and food flavoring in Latin American cuisine. As part of the oil, ascaridole is used as an anthelmintic drug that expels parasitic worms from plants, domestic animals, and the human body.

== History ==
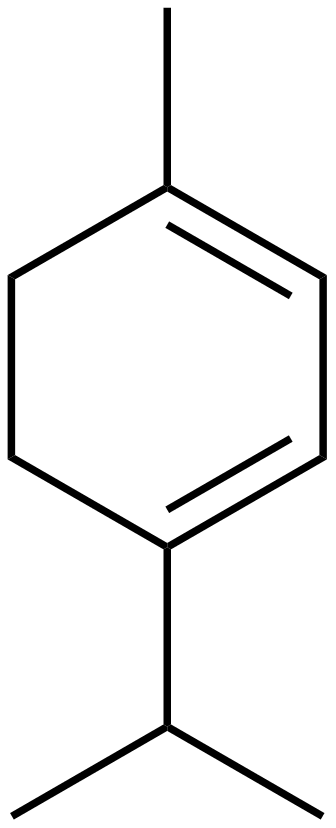
α-Terpinene and ascaridole

Ascaridole was the first, and for a long time only, discovered naturally occurring organic peroxide. It was isolated from Chenopodium oil and named by Hüthig in 1908. He found that when heated to between 130° and 150 °C "there occurs, with sudden boiling in which the temperature momentarily rises to about 250°, a decomposition of an explosive character, occasionally accompanied by ignition. At the same time a very disagreeable skatol-like odour, difficult to define, is observed. In the course of the examination it was found that during the decomposition a gas is split off." He determined its chemical formula as C_{10}H_{16}O_{2}. Hüthig also noted the indifference of ascaridole to aldehydes, ketones or phenols that characterized it as non-alcohol. When reacted with sulfuric acid, or reduced with zinc powder and acetic acid, ascaridole formed cymene. A detailed study was done by E. K. Nelson in 1911. He described the decomposition as apparently a molecular rearrangement, and found that it reacts with sulfuric, hydrochloric, nitric, or phosphoric acids. Nelson showed that the new substance contained neither a hydroxyl nor a carbonyl group and that upon reduction with iron(II) sulfate it formed a glycol, now known as ascaridole glycol, C_{10}H_{18}O_{3}. The glycol is more stable than ascaridole and has a higher melting point of about 64 °C, boiling point of 272 °C, and density of 1.098 g/cm^{3}. Nelson also predicted the chemical structure of ascaridole which was almost correct, but had the peroxide bridge not along the molecular axis, but between the other, off-axis carbon atoms. This structure was corrected by Otto Wallach in 1912.

The first laboratory synthesis was demonstrated in 1944 by Günther Schenck and Karl Ziegler and might be regarded as mimicking the natural production of ascaridole. The process starts from α-terpinene which reacts with oxygen under the influence of chlorophyll and light. Under these conditions singlet oxygen is generated which reacts in a Diels–Alder reaction with the diene system in the terpinene. Since 1945, this reaction has been adopted into the industry for large-scale production of ascaridole in Germany. It was then used as an inexpensive drug against intestinal worms.

== Properties ==
Ascaridole is a colorless liquid that is soluble in most organic solvents. It is toxic and has a pungent, unpleasant smell and taste. Like other pure, low molecular weight organic peroxides, it is unstable and prone to violent decomposition when heated to a temperature above 130 °C or treated with organic acids. When heated, it emits fumes which are poisonous and possibly carcinogenic. Ascaridole (organic peroxide) is forbidden to be shipped as listed in the US Department of Transportation Hazardous Materials Table 49 CFR 172.101.

== Occurrence ==
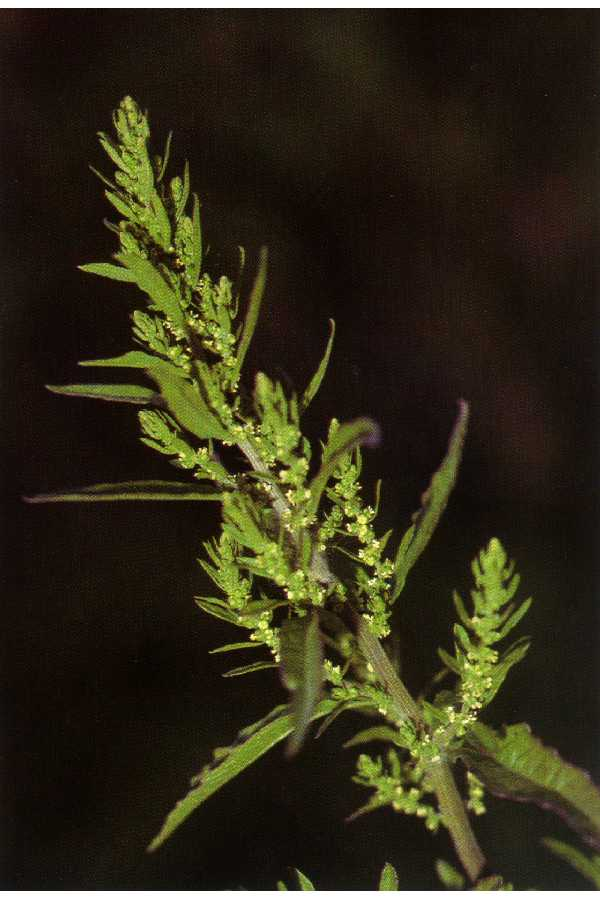
Mexican Tea plant

The specific flavor of the Chilean tree boldo (Peumus boldus) primarily originates from ascaridole. Ascaridole is also a major component of epazote (or Mexican tea, Dysphania ambrosioides, formerly Chenopodium ambrosioides) where it typically constitutes between 16 and 70% of the plant's essential oil. The content of ascaridole in the plant depends on cultivation and is maximal when the nitrogen to phosphorus ratio in the soil is about 1:4. It also changes through the year peaking around the time when the plant seeds become mature.

== Applications ==
Ascaridole is mainly used as an anthelmintic drug that expels parasitic worms (helminths) from the human body and plants. This property gave the name to the chemical, after Ascaris – a genus of the large intestinal roundworm. In the early 1900s, it was a major remedy against intestinal parasites in humans, cats, dogs, goats, sheep, chickens, horses, and pigs, and it is still used in livestock, particularly in the Central American countries. The dosage was specified by the ascaridole content in the oil, which was traditionally determined with an assay developed by Nelson in 1920. It was later substituted with modern gas chromatography and mass spectrometry methods. The worms and their larvae were killed by immersion in a solution of ascaridole in water (about 0.015 vol%) for 18 hours at 50 °F (10 °C) or 12 hours at 60 °F (16 °C) or 6 hours at 65 to 70 °F (18 to 21 °C). Meanwhile, such immersion did not damage the roots and stems of plants such as Iris, Phlox, Sedum and others at 70 °F (21 °C) for 15 hours or longer.

The wormseed plant itself (Mexican tea) is traditionally used in Mexican cuisine for flavoring dishes and preventing flatulence from bean-containing food. It is also part of tonic drinks and infusions to expel intestinal parasites and treat asthma, arthritis, dysentery, stomach ache, malaria, and nervous diseases in folk medicine practiced in North and South America, China, and Turkey.

== Health issues ==
The usage of wormseed oil on humans is limited by the toxicity of ascaridole and has therefore been discouraged. In high doses, wormseed oil causes irritation of skin and mucous membranes, nausea, vomiting, constipation, headache, vertigo, tinnitus, temporary deafness and blindness. Prolonged action induces depression of the central nervous system and delirium which transits into convulsions and coma. Long-term effects include pulmonary edema (fluid accumulation in the lungs), hematuria, and albuminuria (presence of red blood cells and proteins in the urine, respectively) and jaundice (yellowish pigmentation of the skin). Fatal doses of wormseed oil were reported as one teaspoon for a 14-month-old baby (at once) and daily administration of 1 mL over three weeks to a 2-year-old child. Ascaridole is also carcinogenic in rats.
