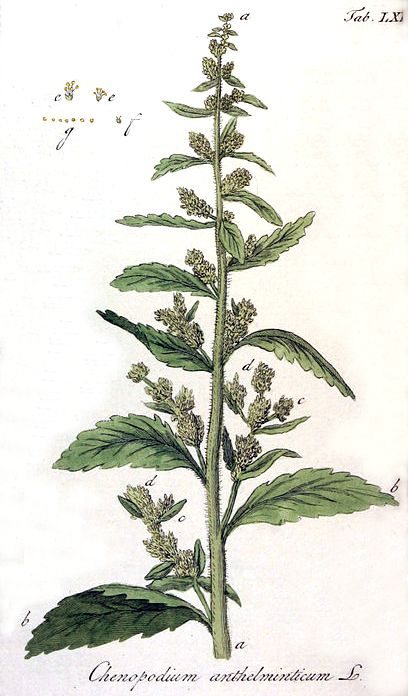
- Dysphania anthelmintica, American Wormseed

Scientific classification
- Kingdom: Plantae
- Clade: Embryophytes
- Clade: Tracheophytes
- Clade: Angiosperms
- Clade: Eudicots
- Order: Caryophyllales
- Family: Amaranthaceae
- Subfamily: Chenopodioideae
- Tribe: Dysphanieae
- Genus: Dysphania; R.Br.

Species
- About 43 species, see text

Synonyms
- List: Ambrina Spach; Amorea Moq. ex Delile; Botrydium Spach; Cyclolepis Moq.; Cycloloma Moq.; Meiomeria Standl.; Neobotrydium Moldenke; Orthospermum Opiz; Orthosporum (R.Br.) T.Nees; Petermannia Rchb.; Roubieva Moq.

= Dysphania (plant) =

Genus of flowering plants

Dysphania is a genus of plants in the family Amaranthaceae. Species of the genus are found worldwide from the tropics and subtropics to warm-temperate regions.

== Description ==
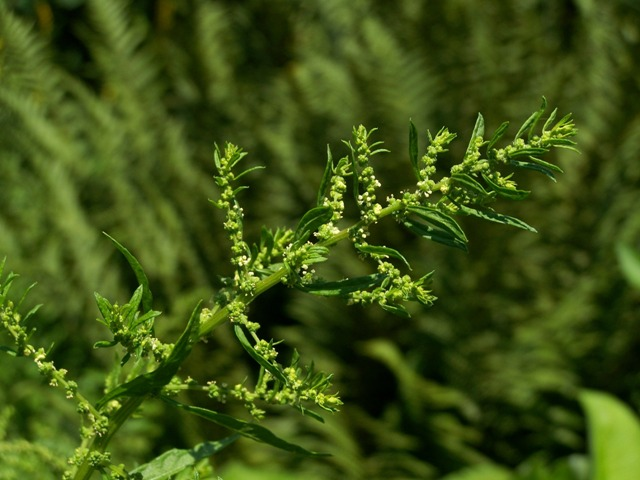
Inflorescence of Epazote (Dysphania ambrosioides)

The species of genus Dysphania are annual plants or short-lived perennials. They are covered with stalked or sessile glandular hairs and therefore with aromatic scent (or malodorous to some people). Some species have uniseriate multicellular trichomes, rarely becoming glabrous. The stems are erect, ascending, decumbent, or prostrate and mostly branched.

The alternate leaves are mostly petiolate, (the upper ones sometimes sessile). The leaf blade is linear, lanceolate, oblanceolate, ovate, or elliptic, often pinnately lobed, with cuneate or truncate base, entire, dentate, or serrate margins.

The inflorescences are terminal, loose, simple or compound cymes or dense axillary glomerules. Bracts are absent or reduced. Flowers are bisexual (rarely unisexual), with up to five tepals connate only basally or fused to form sac, one to five stamens, and a superior ovary with one to three filiform stigmata.

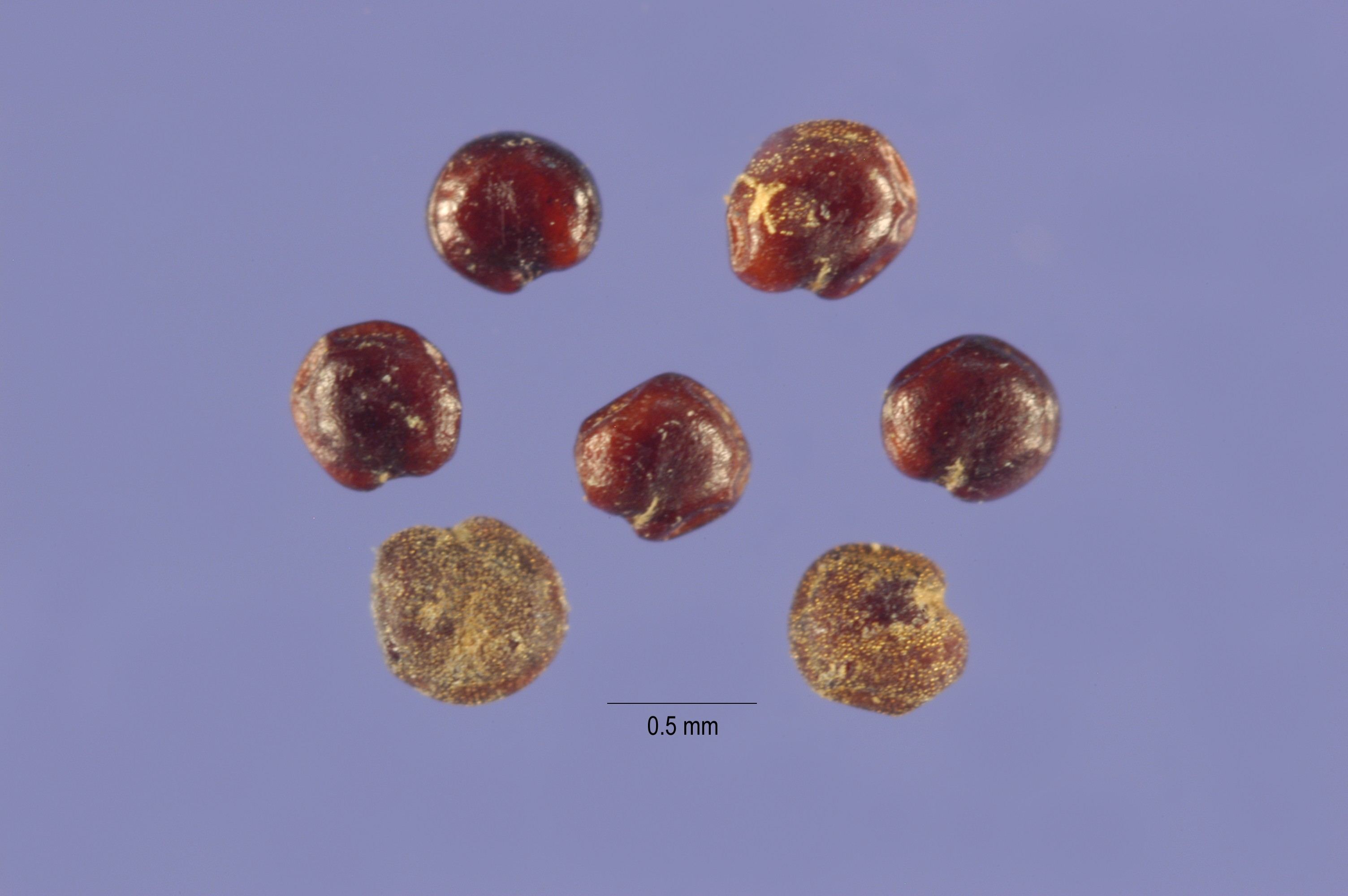
Fruits and seeds of Dysphania botrys

The fruit is often enclosed in perianth. The membranous pericarp is adherent or nonadherent to the horizontal or vertical, subglobose, or lenticular seed. The seed coat is smooth or rugose. The annular or incompletely annular embryo is surrounding the copious farinose perisperm.

=== Chromosome numbers ===
Chromosome numbers reported are 2n=16, 18, 32, 36, and 48.

=== Photosynthesis pathway ===
All species of genus Dysphania are C_{3} plants with normal leaf anatomy.

== Distribution ==
The genus Dysphania is distributed worldwide from the tropics and subtropics to warm-temperate regions. In Europe, the species are native, archaeophytes, or naturalized, in the northern regions absent or rarely adventive.

== Systematics ==
The genus Dysphania belongs to the tribe Dysphanieae in the subfamily Chenopodioideae within the plant family Amaranthaceae. According to phylogenetic research, it is related to genus Suckleya.

Dysphania was first published in 1810 by Robert Brown in Prodromus Florae Novae Hollandiae, p. 411-412. Type species is Dysphania littoralis R.Br..

The genus Dysphania comprised primarily 7-10 Australian species. Some authorities group them as their own separate family, Dysphaniaceae, or alternatively treat them as members of the families Illecebraceae and Caryophyllaceae.

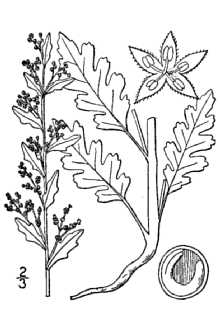
Illustration of Dysphania botrys

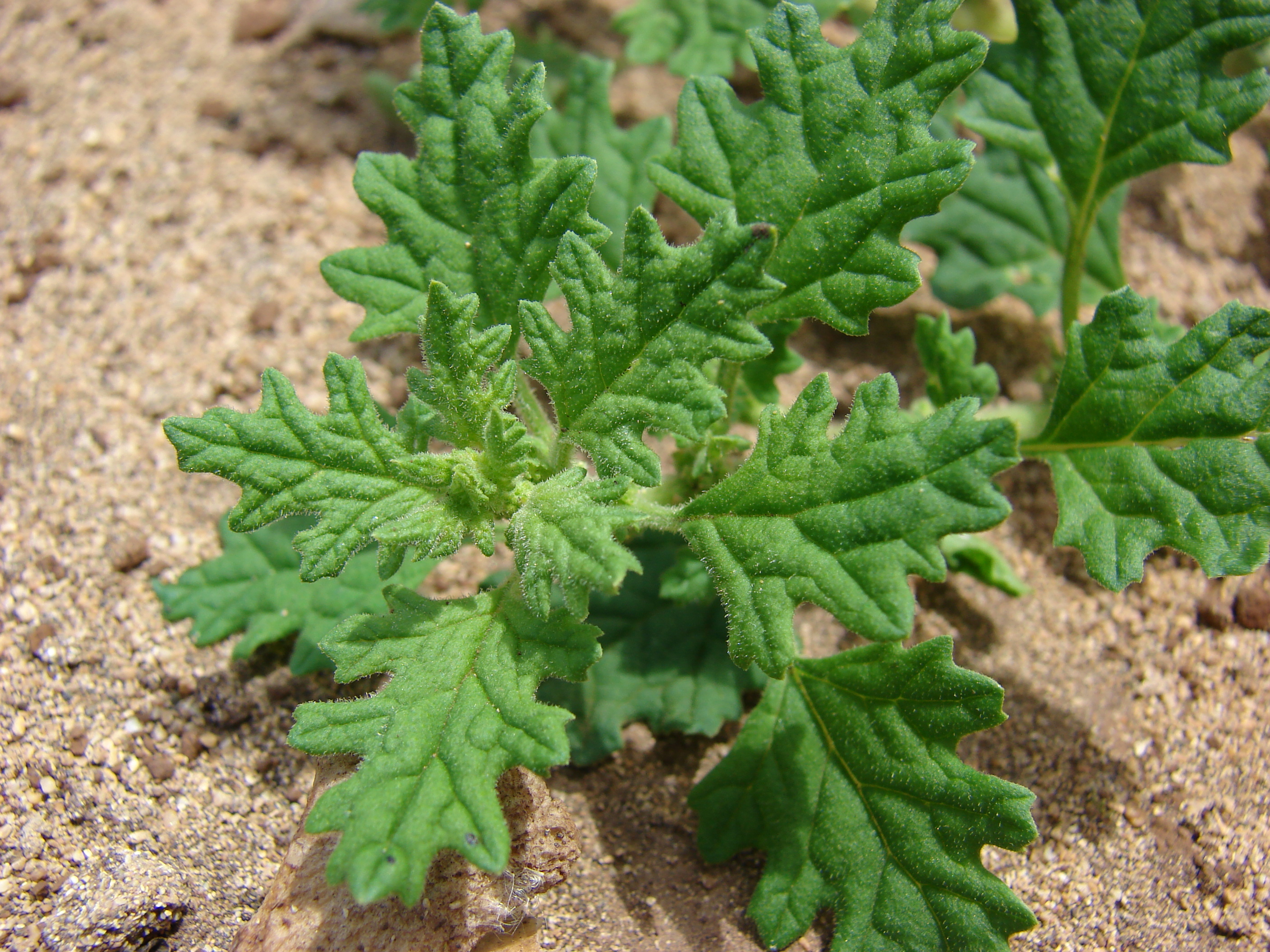
Dysphania carinata

The genus Dysphania consists of 46 species classified in at least four sections:

- Dysphania sect. Adenois (Moq.) Mosyakin & Clemants: 15 species, native in South and Middle America, now distributed worldwide from the tropics to warm-temperate regions:
  - Dysphania ambrosioides (L.) Mosyakin & Clemants - Epazote, Mexican-tea: native in North- and South America, naturalized in other continents.
  - Dysphania anthelmintica (L.) Mosyakin & Clemants
  - Dysphania burkartii (Aellen) Mosyakin & Clemants
  - Dysphania chilensis (Schrad.) Mosyakin & Clemants - native in Argentina and Chile.
  - Dysphania multifida (L.) Mosyakin & Clemants - Cut-leaf goosefoot, small-leaved wormseed: native in South America, introduced from the tropics to warm-temperate regions.
  - Dysphania oblanceolata (Speg.) Mosyakin & Clemants
  - Dysphania tomentosa (Thouars) Mosyakin & Clemants
  - Dysphania venturii (Aellen) Mosyakin & Clemants
- Dysphania sect. Botryoides (C.A.Mey.) Mosyakin & Clemants: with two subsections:
  - Dysphania sect. Botryoides subsect. Botrys (Aellen & Iljin) Mosyakin & Clemants: with 9 species, worldwide, native in southern North America, northern South America, southern Eurasia and Africa.
    - Dysphania botrys (L.) Mosyakin & Clemants - Jerusalem-oak, feather-geranium: native from Middle Europa to China (Xinjiang), naturalized or cultivated in other temperate regions.
    - Dysphania nepalensis (Link ex Colla) Mosyakin & Clemants - in Central Asia
    - Dysphania procera (Hochst. ex Moq.) Mosyakin & Clemants
    - Dysphania pseudomultiflora (Murray) Verloove & Lambinon - In South Africa.
    - Dysphania schraderiana (Schult.) Mosyakin & Clemants
  - Dysphania sect. Botryoides subsect. Incisa (Standley) Mosyakin & Clemants:
    - Dysphania dissecta (Moq.) Mosyakin & Clemants - south-western North America and in South America
    - Dysphania incisa (Poir.) ined.
- Dysphania sect. Dysphania, with 8 species in Australia:
  - Dysphania glandulosa Paul G.Wilson - in Australia
  - Dysphania glomulifera (Nees) Paul G.Wilson - in Australia
  - Dysphania kalpari Paul G.Wilson - in Australia
  - Dysphania littoralis R.Br. - in Australia
  - Dysphania plantaginella F.Muell. - in Australia
  - Dysphania platycarpa Paul G.Wilson - in Australia
  - Dysphania rhadinostachya (F.Muell.) A.J.Scott - in Australia
  - Dysphania simulans F.Muell. & Tate - in Australia
  - Dysphania sphaerosperma Paul G.Wilson - in Australia
  - Dysphania valida Paul G.Wilson - in Australia
- Dysphania sect. Orthospora (R.Br.) Mosyakin & Clemants: with 7 species in New Zealand and Australia, some species introduced in other regions:
  - Dysphania carinata (R.Br.) Mosyakin & Clemants - native in Australia, naturalized in other continents.
  - Dysphania cristata (F.Muell.) Mosyakin & Clemants) - native in Australia, naturalized in other continents.
  - Dysphania melanocarpa (J.M.Black) Mosyakin & Clemants - black crumbweed
  - Dysphania pumilio (R.Br.) Mosyakin & Clemants - Clammy goosefoot, small crumbweed: native in Australia, naturalized in other continents.
  - Dysphania pusilla Mosyakin & Clemants
  - Dysphania saxatilis (Paul G.Wilson) Mosyakin & Clemants
  - Dysphania truncata (Paul G.Wilson) Mosyakin & Clemants
- Not yet grouped to a section:
  - Dysphania atriplicifolia (Spreng.) G.Kadereit, Sukhor. & Uotila
  - Dysphania bhutanica Sukhor.
  - Dysphania bonariensis (Hook.f.) Mosyakin & Clemants ex Sukhor.
  - Dysphania × bontei (Aellen) Stace
  - Dysphania × christii (Aellen) Stace
  - Dysphania congestiflora S.J.Dillon & A.S.Markey
  - Dysphania congolana (Hauman) Mosyakin & Clemants - in Africa
  - Dysphania geoffreyi Sukhor.
  - Dysphania himalaica Uotila
  - Dysphania kitiae Uotila
  - Dysphania minuata (Aellen) Mosyakin & Clemants
  - Dysphania multiflora (Moq.) G.Kadereit, Sukhor. & Uotila
  - Dysphania neglecta Sukhor.
  - Dysphania retusa (Moq.) Mosyakin & Clemants ex Brignone
  - Dysphania stellata (S.Watson) Mosyakin & Clemants - This species has 6-8 tepals
  - Dysphania tibetica (A.J.Li) Uotila

== Usage ==
Epazote or Mexican tea (Dysphania ambrosioides) and American wormseed (Dysphania anthelmintica) are medicinal herbs. Epazote is used as a tisane and as an insecticide. Some species of Dysphania are used as dye.
