= Dysphania pseudomultiflora =

Scientific classification
- Kingdom: Plantae
- Clade: Tracheophytes
- Clade: Angiosperms
- Clade: Eudicots
- Order: Caryophyllales
- Family: Amaranthaceae
- Genus: Dysphania
- Species: D. pseudomultiflora

Binomial name
- Dysphania pseudomultiflora (Murr) Verloove & Lambinon

Synonyms
- Chenopodium foetidum Schrad. subsp. pseudomultiflorum Murr.

Species of flowering plant

Dysphania pseudomultiflora is an herbaceous plant native to southern Africa, in the family Amaranthaceae. It is aromatic, and used medicinally in the region where it occurs.

The plant was long known as Chenopodium foetidum Schrad. subsp. pseudomultiflorum Murr. but recent studies have determined that Dysphania merits being recognized as a separate genus.

== Synonyms ==
- Dysphania pseudomultiflora (Murr) Verloove & Lambinon, Syst. & Geogr. Pl. 76(2): 219. 2006 [18 Dec 2006]
  - Chenopodium foetidum Schrad. subsp. pseudomultiflorum Murr Bull. Herb. Boissier ser. 2, 4: 991. 1904
