= Mole de olla =

Traditional Mexican soup

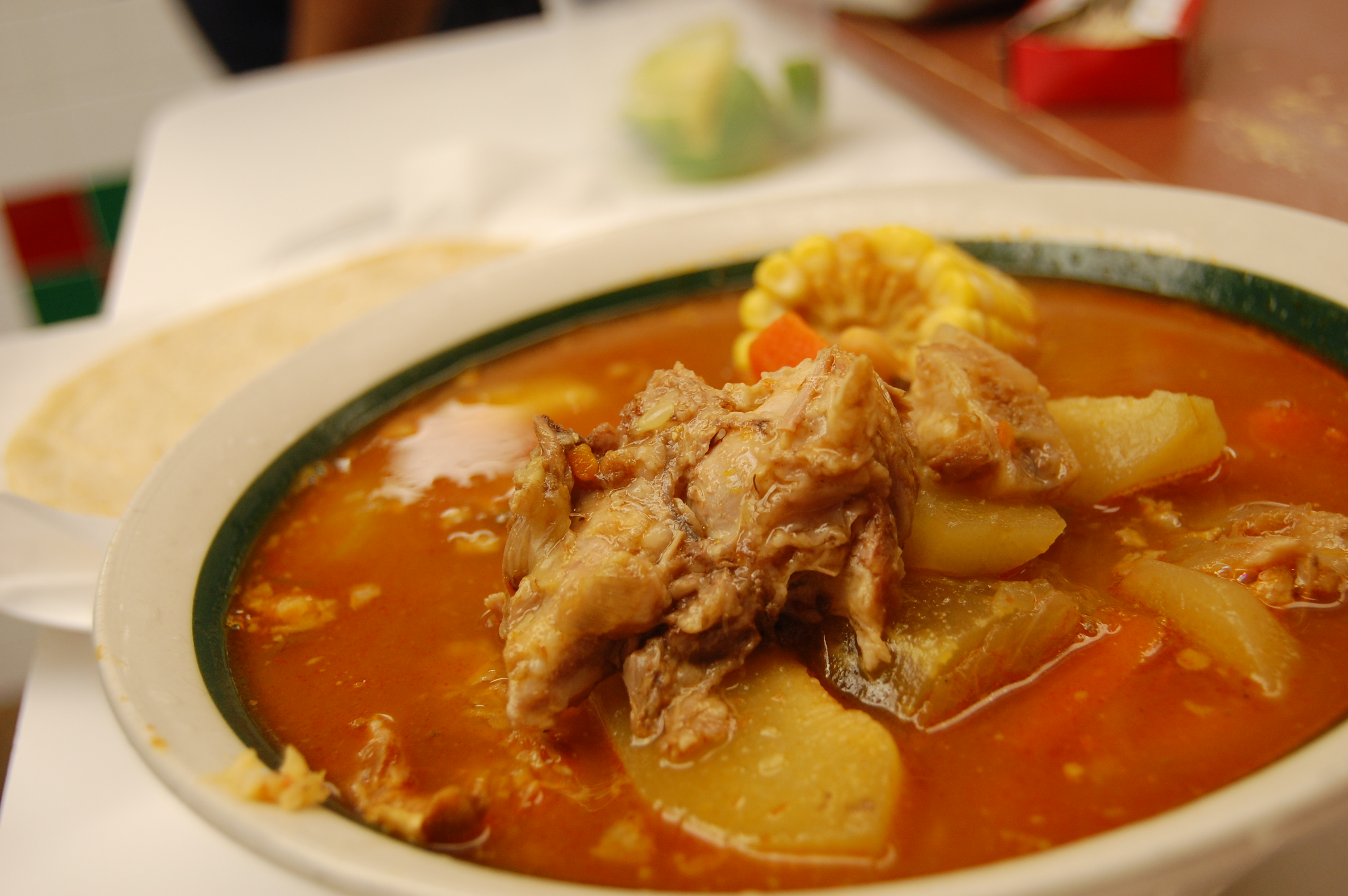
- Type: soup
- Place of origin: Mexico
- Main ingredients: xoconostle, chile guajillo, chile pasilla, meat, chayote, corn, potato, zucchini, green beans

Mole de olla is a Mexican traditional soup made of beef chuck (aguja), beef shank (chambarete), xoconostle (a kind of edible cactus), chayote, zucchini, green beans, corn, potatoes, and cabbage flavored with a thin mole of ground chile guajillo, chile pasilla, garlic, onion, and epazote. It is served with pieces of chopped serrano pepper and limes.

== See also ==
- List of soups
