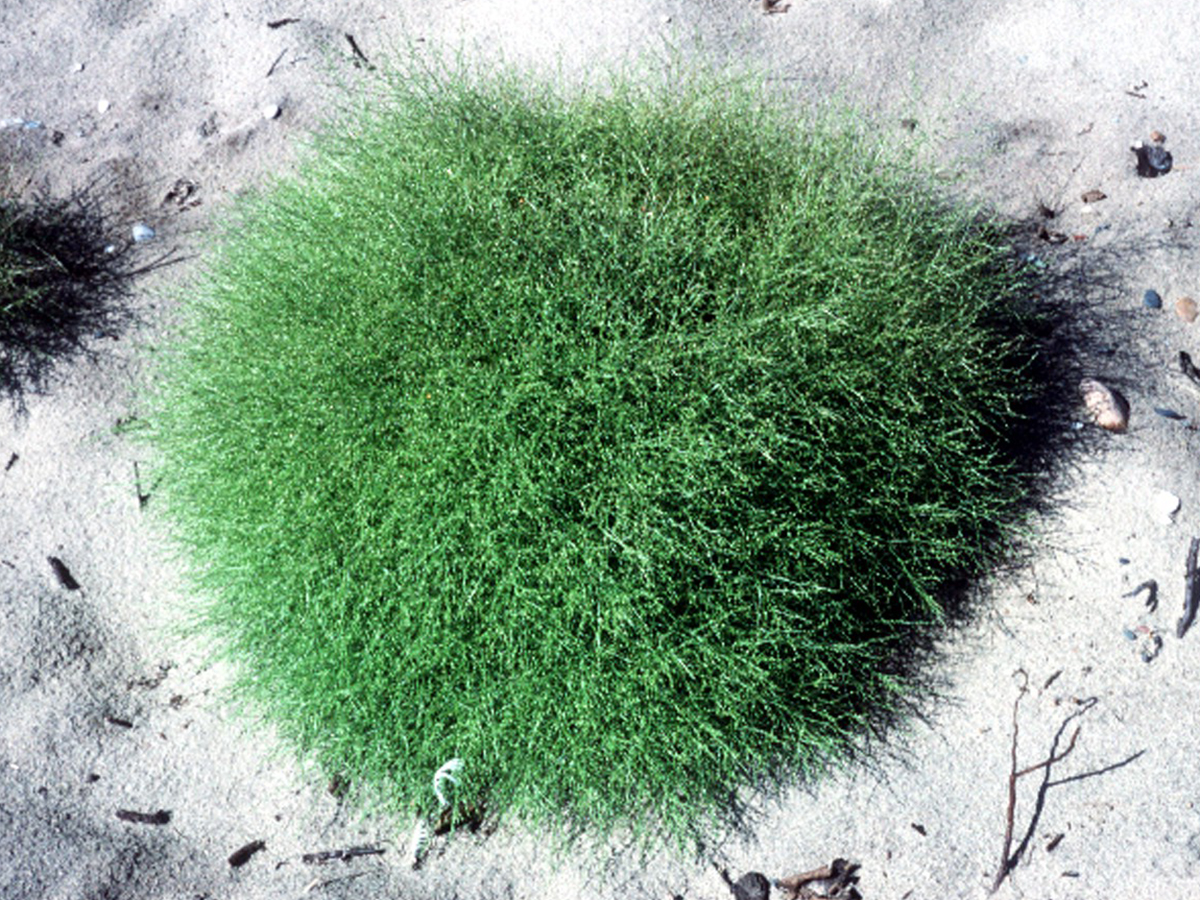

Scientific classification
- Kingdom: Plantae
- Clade: Embryophytes
- Clade: Tracheophytes
- Clade: Angiosperms
- Clade: Eudicots
- Order: Caryophyllales
- Family: Amaranthaceae
- Subfamily: Chenopodioideae
- Tribe: Dysphanieae
- Genus: Dysphania
- Species: D. atriplicifolia

Binomial name
- Dysphania atriplicifolia (Spreng.) G.Kadereit, Sukhor. & Uotila (2021)

Synonyms
- Amorea platyphylla (Michx.) Delile (1844); Chenopodium atriplicifolium (Spreng.) A.Ludw. ex Graebn. (1913); Chenopodium radiatum Schrad. (1809); Cyclolepis platyphylla (Michx.) Moq. (1834); Cycloloma atriplicifolium (Spreng.) J.M.Coult. (1894); Cycloloma platyphyllum (Michx.) Moq. (1840); Kochia atriplicifolia (Spreng.) Roth (1802); Kochia dentata Willd. (1804); Kochia platyphylla (Michx.) Schult. (1820); Salsola atriplicifolia Spreng. (1801) (basionym); Salsola atriplicis Schult. (1809); Salsola chenopodioides Dum.Cours. (1811); Salsola corymbosa Moq. (1849); Salsola dentata (Willd.) Germann (1807); Salsola latifolia Poir. (1806); Salsola paniculata Moq. (1849); Salsola platyphylla Michx. (1803); Salsola radiata Desf. (1803); Salsola stellata Moq. (1849)

= Dysphania atriplicifolia =

Species of flowering plant

Dysphania atriplicifolia (synonym Cycloloma atriplicifolium) is species of flowering plant known by the common names winged pigweed, tumble ringwing, plains tumbleweed, and tumble-weed.

== Distribution and habitat ==
This plant is native to central North America, but it is spreading and has been occasionally reported in far-flung areas from California to Maine to the Canadian prairie. It is considered an introduced species outside of central North America.

== Description ==
This is a bushy annual herb forming a rounded pale green clump which may exceed 0.5 m (1 ft 8 in) in height. It is very intricately branched, with toothed leaves occurring near the base. The spreading stems bear widely spaced flowers are small immature fruits fringed with a nearly transparent membranous wing. In autumn, the plant forms a tumbleweed. The fruit is a utricle about 2 millimeters long containing a single seed.

== Uses ==
The seeds are eaten as a food staple by Native American peoples including the Zuni and Hopi. The Zuni people mix the seeds with ground corn to make a mush. The Zuni also grind the seeds, mix them with corn meal and make them into steamed cakes. The Zuni also chew the blossoms and rub them all over the hands for protection.
