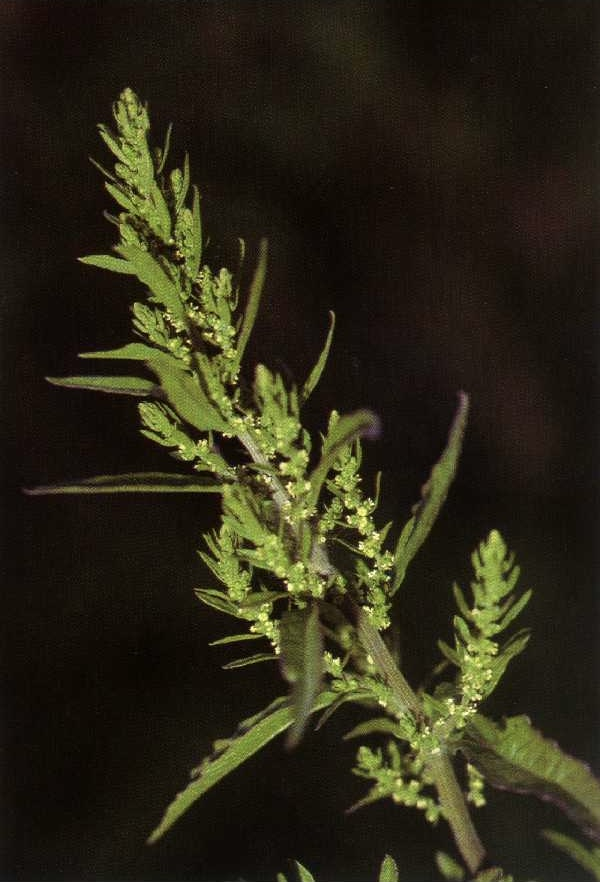

Scientific classification
- Kingdom: Plantae
- Clade: Tracheophytes
- Clade: Angiosperms
- Clade: Eudicots
- Order: Caryophyllales
- Family: Amaranthaceae
- Genus: Dysphania
- Species: D. ambrosioides

Binomial name
- Dysphania ambrosioides (L.) Mosyakin & Clemants

Synonyms
- Ambrina ambrosioides (L.) Spach; Ambrina parvula Phil.; Ambrina spathulata Moq.; Atriplex ambrosioides (L.) Crantz; Blitum ambrosioides (L.) Beck; Botrys ambrosioides (L.) Nieuwl.; Chenopodium ambrosioidesL.; Chenopodium integrifolium Vorosch.; Chenopodium spathulatum Sieber ex Moq.; Chenopodium suffruticosum subsp. remotum Vorosch.; Chenopodium suffruticosum Willd.; Orthosporum ambrosioides (L.) Kostel.; Orthosporum suffruticosum Kostel.; Teloxys ambrosioides (L.) W.A. Weber; Vulvaria ambrosioides (L.) Bubani

= Dysphania ambrosioides =

Species of flowering plant

Dysphania ambrosioides, formerly Chenopodium ambrosioides, known as epazote, Jesuit's tea, Mexican tea or wormseed, is an annual or short-lived perennial herb native to the Americas.

== Description ==
Dysphania ambrosioides is an annual or short-lived perennial herb, growing to 1.2 m (4 ft) tall, irregularly branched, with oblong-lanceolate leaves up to 12 cm (4 1/2 in) long. The flowers are small and green, produced in a branched panicle at the apex of the stem.

As well as in its native areas, it is grown in warm temperate to subtropical areas of Europe and the United States (Missouri, New England, Eastern US), sometimes becoming an invasive weed.

=== Chemistry ===
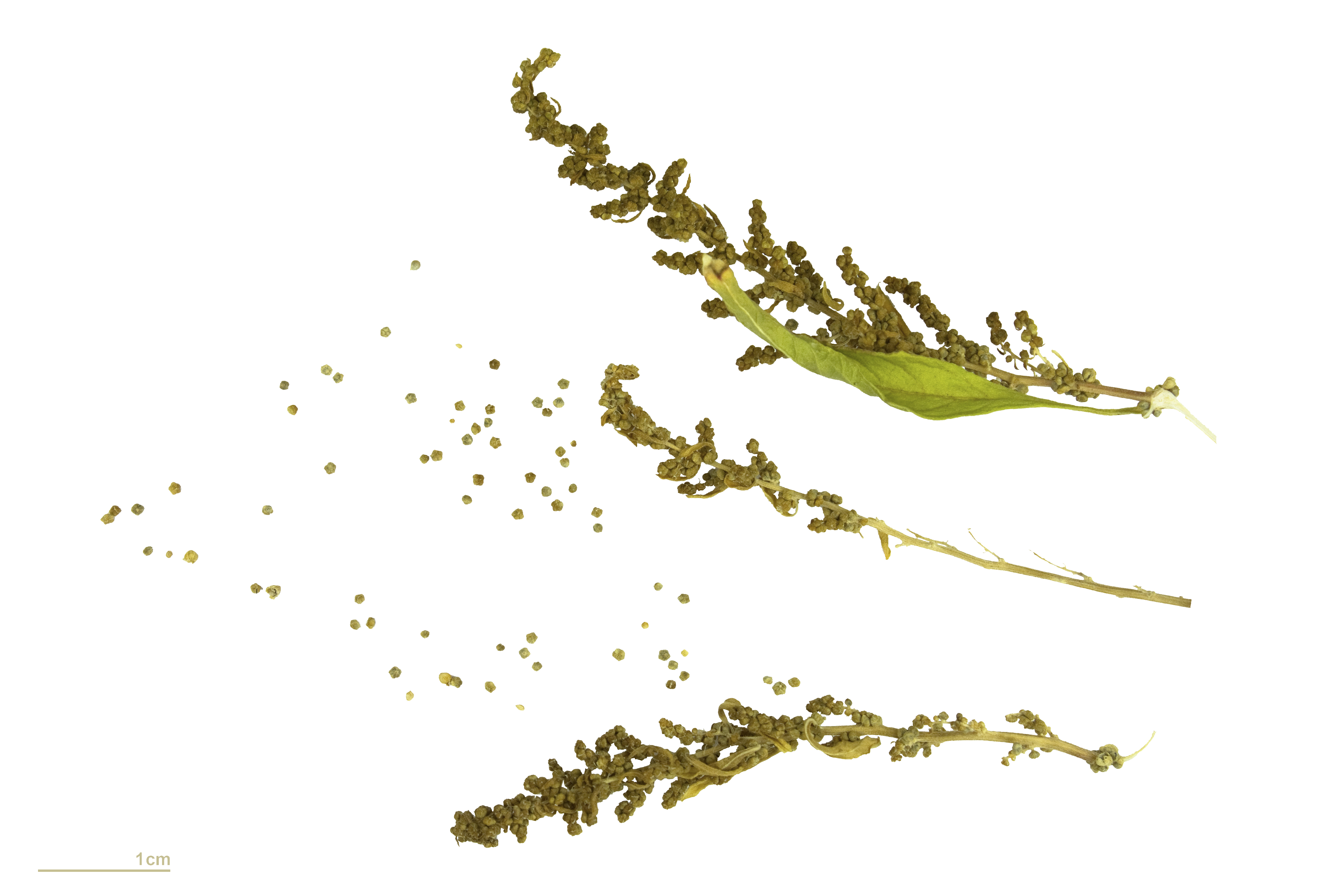
Dysphania ambrosioides – MHNT

Epazote essential oil contains ascaridole (up to 70%), limonene, p-cymene, and smaller amounts of numerous other monoterpenes and monoterpene derivatives (α-pinene, myrcene, terpinene, thymol, camphor and trans-isocarveol). Ascaridole (1,4-peroxido-p-menth-2-ene) is rather an uncommon constituent of spices; another plant owing much of its character to this monoterpene peroxide is boldo. Ascaridole is slightly toxic and has a pungent, not very pleasant flavor. In pure form, ascaridole decomposes violently upon heating, but this is relatively weak in regards to energy release, since breaking the oxygen bond will not destroy the entire molecule. Ascaridole content is lower in epazote from Mexico than in epazote grown in Europe or Asia.

== Taxonomy ==
The species was described in 1753 by Carl Linnaeus as Chenopodium ambrosioides. Some researchers treated it as a highly polymorphic species with several subspecies. Today these are considered as their own species within genus Dysphania (e.g. American wormseed, Chenopodium ambrosioides var. anthelminticum is now accepted as Dysphania anthelmintica).

The generic name Dysphania was traditionally applied in the 1930s to some species endemic to Australia. Placement and rank of this taxon have ranged from a mere section within Chenopodium to the sole genus of a separate family, Dysphaniaceae, or a representative of the Illicebraceae. The close affinity of Dysphania to "glandular" species of Chenopodium sensu lato is now evident.

The specific epithet ambrosioides refers to the plant's resemblance to unrelated plants of the genus Ambrosia, in the aster family.

== Etymology ==
The common Spanish name epazote (sometimes spelled and pronounced ipasote or ypasote) is derived from the Nahuatl word epazōtl (pronounced [eˈpasoːt͡ɬ]).

== Toxicity ==
Humans have died from overdoses of D. ambrosioides essential oils (attributed to the ascaridole content). Symptoms include severe gastroenteritis with pain, vomiting, and diarrhea, dizziness, headache, temporary deafness, kidney and liver damage, convulsions, paralysis, death.

== Uses ==
=== Culinary ===
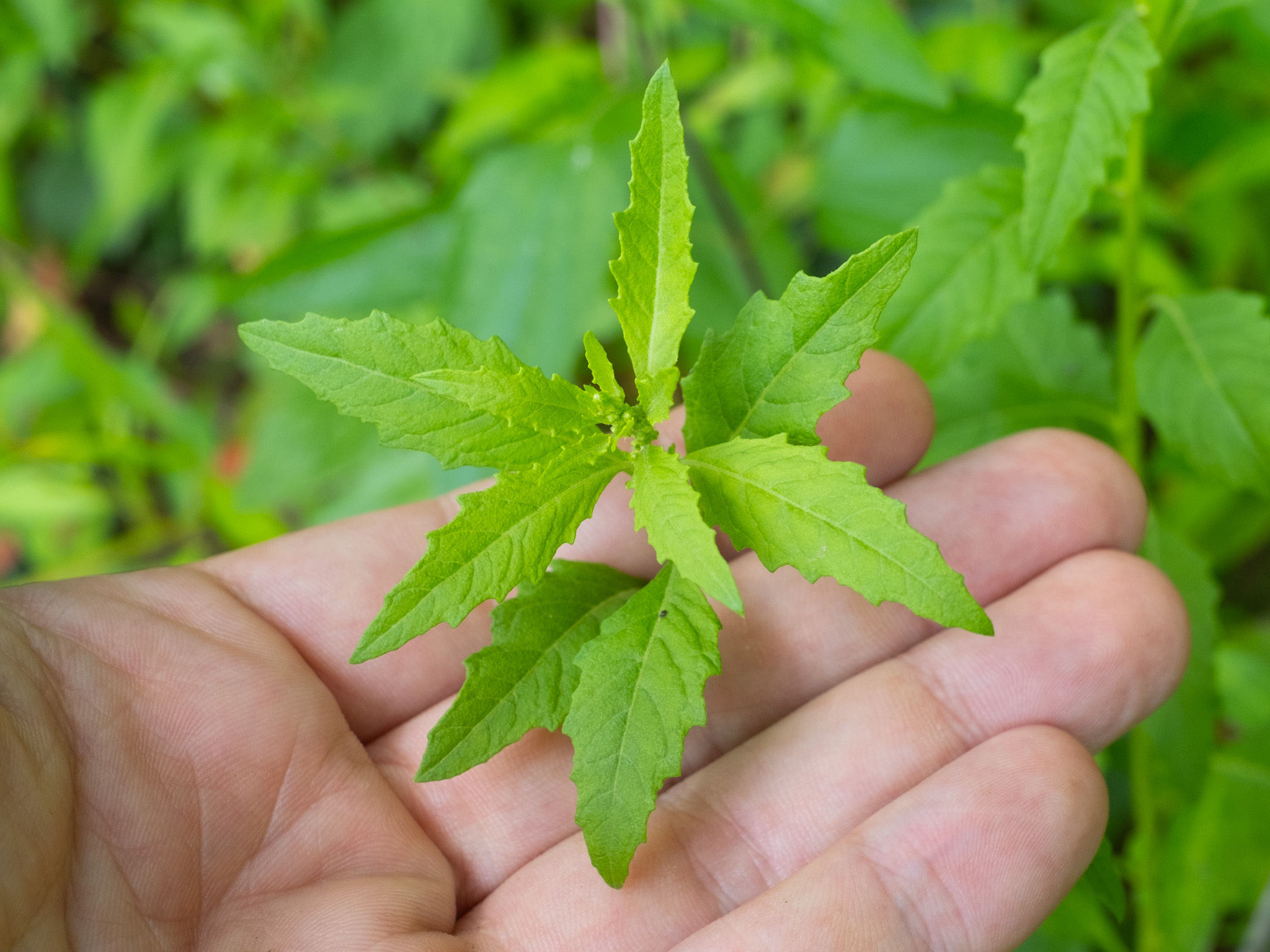
Dysphania ambrosioides leaves

Ideally collected before going to seed, D. ambrosioides is used as a leaf vegetable, herb, and herbal tea, for its strong aroma and flavor. The fragrance of D. ambrosioides is strong and unique. Raw, it has a resinous, medicinal aroma, similar to oregano, anise, fennel, or even tarragon, but stronger. A common analogy is to turpentine or creosote. It has also been compared to citrus, savory, and mint.

Although it is traditionally used with black beans for flavor and its antiflatulent properties, it is also sometimes used to flavor other traditional Mexican dishes: it can be used to season quesadillas and sopes (especially those containing huitlacoche), soups, mole de olla, tamales with cheese and chili peppers, chilaquiles, eggs and potatoes, esquites, and enchiladas. It is often cooked into fried white rice, and it is an important ingredient for making the green salsa for chilaquiles.

In the Philippines, where it is called pasotes or pasyotes, it is a characteristic herb of Vigan pipian, a chicken porridge distinct from the namesake Mexican pipian. It is also used in the longganisa of Sampaloc, Quezon, and as a stuffing for lechon in Carcar, Cebu.

=== Agricultural ===
The essential oils of D. ambrosioides contain terpene compounds, some of which have natural pesticide capabilities. The compound ascaridole in epazote inhibits the growth of nearby species, so it is best to grow it at a distance from other plants.

=== Companion plant ===
Dysphania ambrosioides not only contains terpene compounds, but it also delivers partial protection to nearby plants simply by masking their scent to some insects, making it a useful companion plant. Its small flowers may also attract some predatory wasps and flies.
