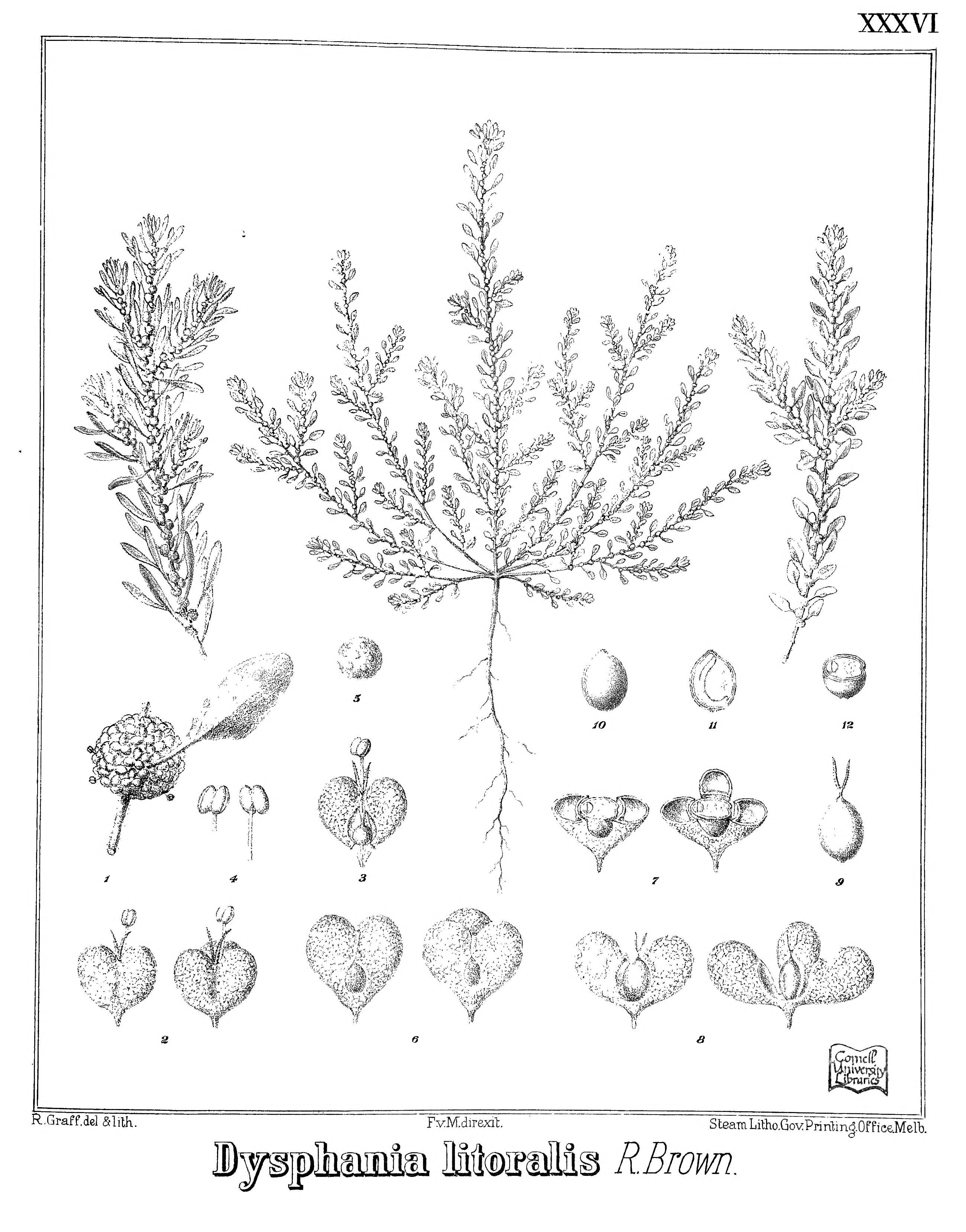

Scientific classification
- Kingdom: Plantae
- Clade: Tracheophytes
- Clade: Angiosperms
- Clade: Eudicots
- Order: Caryophyllales
- Family: Amaranthaceae
- Genus: Dysphania
- Species: D. littoralis

Binomial name
- Dysphania littoralis R.Br.

= Dysphania littoralis =

Species of flowering plant

Dysphania littoralis, the red crumbweed, is a small, prostrate annual plant flowering year round.
