= Boldine =

Names
- IUPAC name 1,10-Dimethoxyaporphine-2,9-diol
- Systematic IUPAC name (6aS)-1,10-Dimethoxy-6-methyl-5,6,6a,7-tetrahydro-4H-dibenzo[de,g]quinoline-2,9-diol

Identifiers
CAS Number	476-70-0
3D model (JSmol)	Interactive image
ChEMBL	ChEMBL388342
ChemSpider	9748
ECHA InfoCard	100.006.828
PubChem CID	10154
UNII	8I91GE2769
CompTox Dashboard (EPA)	DTXSID40883394
- InChI: InChI=1S/C19H21NO4/c1-20-5-4-10-7-15(22)19(24-3)18-12-9-16(23-2)14(21)8-11(12)6-13(20)17(10)18/h7-9,13,21-22H,4-6H2,1-3H3/t13-/m0/s1 Key: LZJRNLRASBVRRX-ZDUSSCGKSA-N; InChI=1/C19H21NO4/c1-20-5-4-10-7-15(22)19(24-3)18-12-9-16(23-2)14(21)8-11(12)6-13(20)17(10)18/h7-9,13,21-22H,4-6H2,1-3H3/t13-/m0/s1 Key: LZJRNLRASBVRRX-ZDUSSCGKBM
- SMILES: CN1CCC2=CC(=C(C3=C2[C@@H]1CC4=CC(=C(C=C43)OC)O)OC)O

Properties
Chemical formula	C_{19}H_{21}NO_{4}
Molar mass	327.380 g·mol^{−1}
- Except where otherwise noted, data are given for materials in their standard state (at 25 °C [77 °F], 100 kPa). verify (what is ?) Infobox references

Boldine is an alkaloid of the aporphine class that is characteristic of the boldo tree Peumus boldus Molina. It is the most abundant alkaloid found in boldo bark, although it is not present in the leaves. Boldine is also found in Lindera aggregata.
