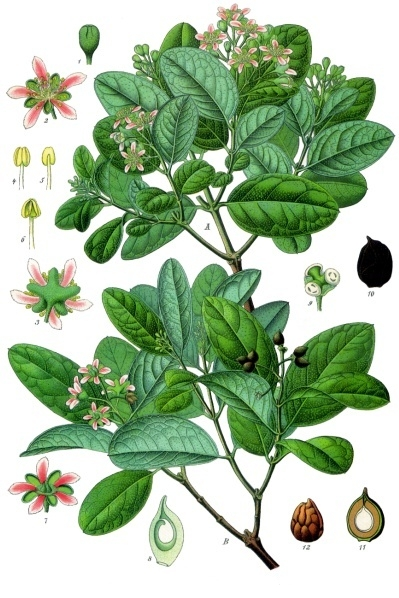

Conservation status
- Least Concern (IUCN 3.1)

Scientific classification
- Kingdom: Plantae
- Clade: Tracheophytes
- Clade: Angiosperms
- Clade: Magnoliids
- Order: Laurales
- Family: Monimiaceae
- Genus: Peumus; Molina
- Species: P. boldus

Binomial name
- Peumus boldus Molina

Synonyms
- Boldea Juss.; Boldu Adans.; Ruizia Ruiz & Pav., nom. illeg. homonym. post.; Boldea boldus (Molina) Looser; Boldea fragrans (Ruiz & Pav.) Endl.; Boldoa fragrans (Pers.) Endl.; Boldu chilanum Nees; Boldu olivifera Feuillée ex Thouin; Boldus boldus (Molina) Lyons; Boldus chilensis Schult. & Schult.f.; Laurus belloto Miers ex Nees; Laurus lingui Bridges ex Nees; Peumus fragrans (Ruiz & Pav.) Pers.; Ruizia fragrans Ruiz & Pav.

= Boldo =

Species of plant

Peumus boldus, commonly known as boldo (from the Mapuche name foḻo), is a species of tree in the family Monimiaceae and the only species in the genus Peumus. It is endemic to the central region of Chile, between 33° and 40° southern latitude. Boldo has also been introduced to Europe and North Africa, though it is not often seen outside botanical gardens.

Due to its common name, it is often confused with the species Plectranthus ornatus, known as falso boldo ("false boldo"), boldo paraguayo or boldo rastrero, which has led to confusion about the uses, properties and toxicity of both species.

== Description ==
Boldo, together with litre, quillay, peumo, bollén and other indigenous plants, is a characteristic component of the sclerophyllous forests endemic to central Chile. Its leaves, which have a strong, woody and slightly bitter flavor and camphor-like aroma, are used for culinary purposes, primarily in Latin America. The leaves are used in a similar manner to bay leaves and are also prepared as a herbal tea, primarily in Chile and Argentina.

The edible fruits are small drupes about 2 centimeters in diameter, green in color and having a pleasant flavor. Though not well known outside their native range, boldo fruits, which appear between December and February, are very small, green, edible spheres. Boldo has a strong flavor, which primarily comes from the chemical ascaridole, which is also present in the epazote plant.

== Uses ==
In Brazil, Argentina, Chile, Uruguay, and Paraguay, boldo is mixed with yerba mate or other teas to moderate its flavor. Some families keep a boldo plant at home for this purpose, although boldo teabags are readily available in nearly all supermarkets.

Boldo and plants with similar properties are widely used as mild folk medicine in various South American countries in both urban and rural areas, even among people who do not usually drink herbal teas other than mate beverage. In Brazilian pharmacopoeia, boldo is an officially listed phytotherapeutic plant, as a cholagogue and choleretic used for treatment of mild dyspepsia.

Boldo is in the family Monimiaceae, which is closely related to the family Lauraceae (which includes many other plants used for their aromatic leaves, such as cinnamon, cassia, bay leaf, and camphor laurel).

Boldo leaves have a slightly bitter, soft flavor and a bit of a rough, coniferous taste when brewed in tea. They are used as a culinary herb to spice many savory dishes including fish, mushrooms, and vegetables and as a component in sauces. In some local South American kitchens boldo leaves are also popular for wrapping frying fish and meat. Boldo fruits, when dried, are used to make spicy condiments.

== Toxicity ==
Boldine

In 2009, the European Medicines Agency assessed boldo as follows:

Boldo leaf contains the alkaloid boldine. Boldo leaf also contains 2–4% of volatile oil. Major constituents reported as: ascaridole (16–38%), 1,8-cineole (11–39%) and p-Cymene (9–29%). Ascaridole is highly toxic, and this raises concerns about the suitability of boldo leaf in traditional herbal medicinal products.

Abortifacient and teratogenic effects in rats were observed with very high doses (800 mg/kg) of a dry ethanolic extract of boldine in the first days of pregnancy, not present at lower doses.

Most investigations have been carried out using boldine.

Limited information is available on herbal preparations of boldo leaf and where studies have been reported, details of the preparations are usually lacking. There are no reported genotoxicity or carcinogenicity studies with herbal preparations of boldo leaf.

Boldo oil should not be used internally or externally. Where boldo leaf is used, the total exposure to ascaridole should be considered from a safety standpoint. The levels of ascaridole in herbal medicinal products should be quantified. In view of the low solubility of ascaridole in water, the use of aqueous extracts including herbal teas could be accepted. The use of ethanolic extracts of boldo leaf is not considered acceptable for traditional herbal medicinal products, in view of the potentially higher levels of the toxic ascaridole constituent.
