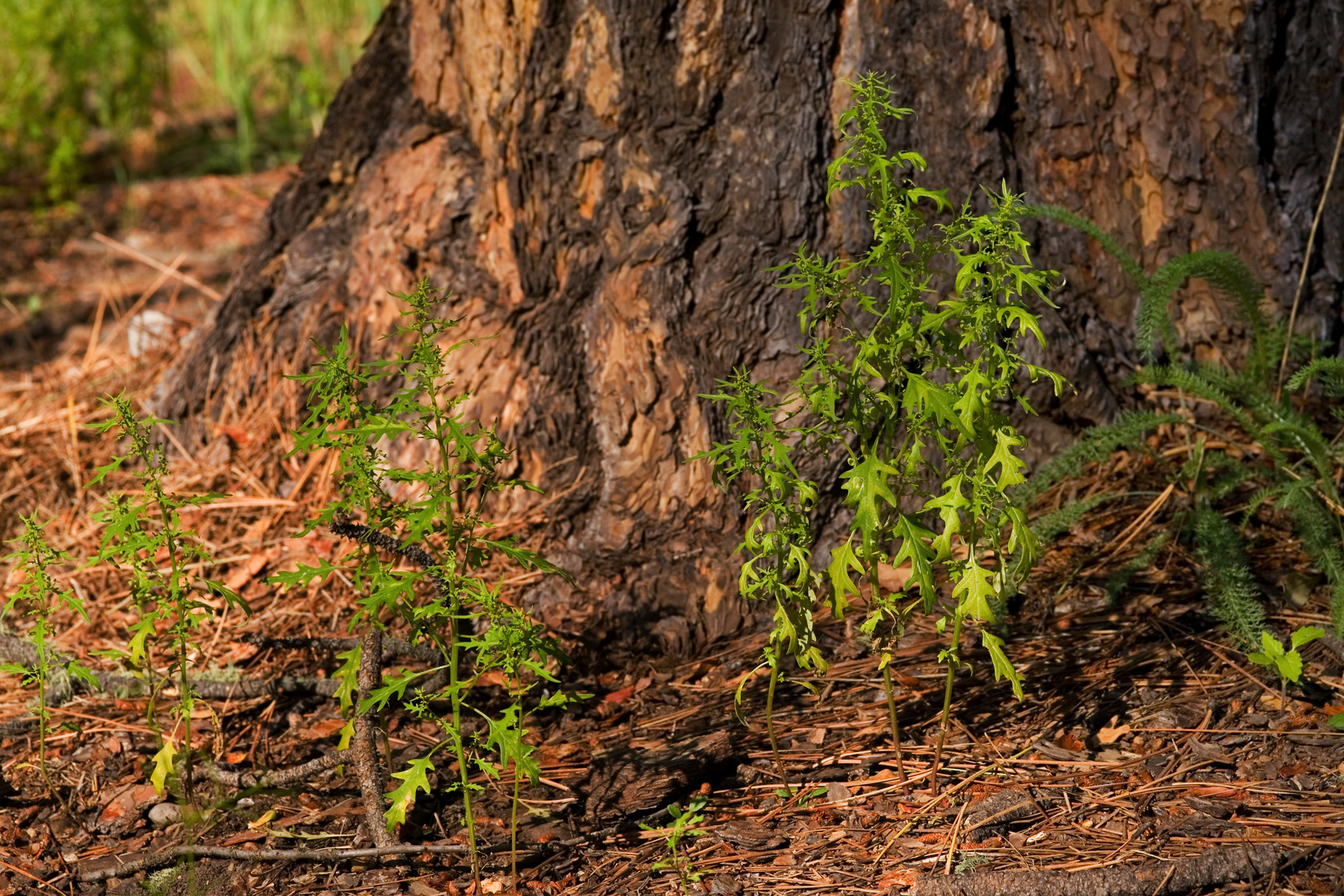

Scientific classification
- Kingdom: Plantae
- Clade: Tracheophytes
- Clade: Angiosperms
- Clade: Eudicots
- Order: Caryophyllales
- Family: Amaranthaceae
- Genus: Dysphania
- Species: D. graveolens

Binomial name
- Dysphania graveolens (Willd.) Mosyakin & Clemants

Synonyms
- List: Ambrina graveolens (Lag. & Rodr.) Moq.; Ambrina incisa (Poir.) Moq.; Chenopodium ambrosioides var. graveolens Speg.; Chenopodium graveolens Lag. & Rodr.; Chenopodium graveolens Willd.; Chenopodium incisum Poir.; Chenopodium mandonii (S.Watan.) Aellen; Chenopodium rigidum Lingelsh.; Dysphania incisa (Poir.) ined.; Dysphania mandonii (S.Watan.) Mosyakin & Clemants; Neobotrydium graveolens (Lag. & Rodr.) M.L.Zhang & G.L.Chu; Neobotrydium incisum (Poir.) M.L.Zhang & G.L.Chu; Teloxys graveolens W.A.Weber; Teloxys mandonii S.Watan.

= Dysphania graveolens =

Species of flowering plant

Dysphania graveolens, common name fetid goosefoot, is a species of flowering plant in the family Amaranthaceae. It is found from Utah, Arizona and west Texas to Guatemala, Peru and northwest Argentina. It has been introduced elsewhere including the east coast of the United States (Maine, Massachusetts and New York state). It has many synonyms, including Chenopodium graveolens and Dysphania incisa. In 2021, the correct name in Dysphania was said to be Dysphania graveolens, although as of 12 April 2022, Plants of the World Online accepted the unpublished name Dysphania incisa.

== Uses ==
The Zuni people steep the plant in water and inhale the vapor to treat headaches.
