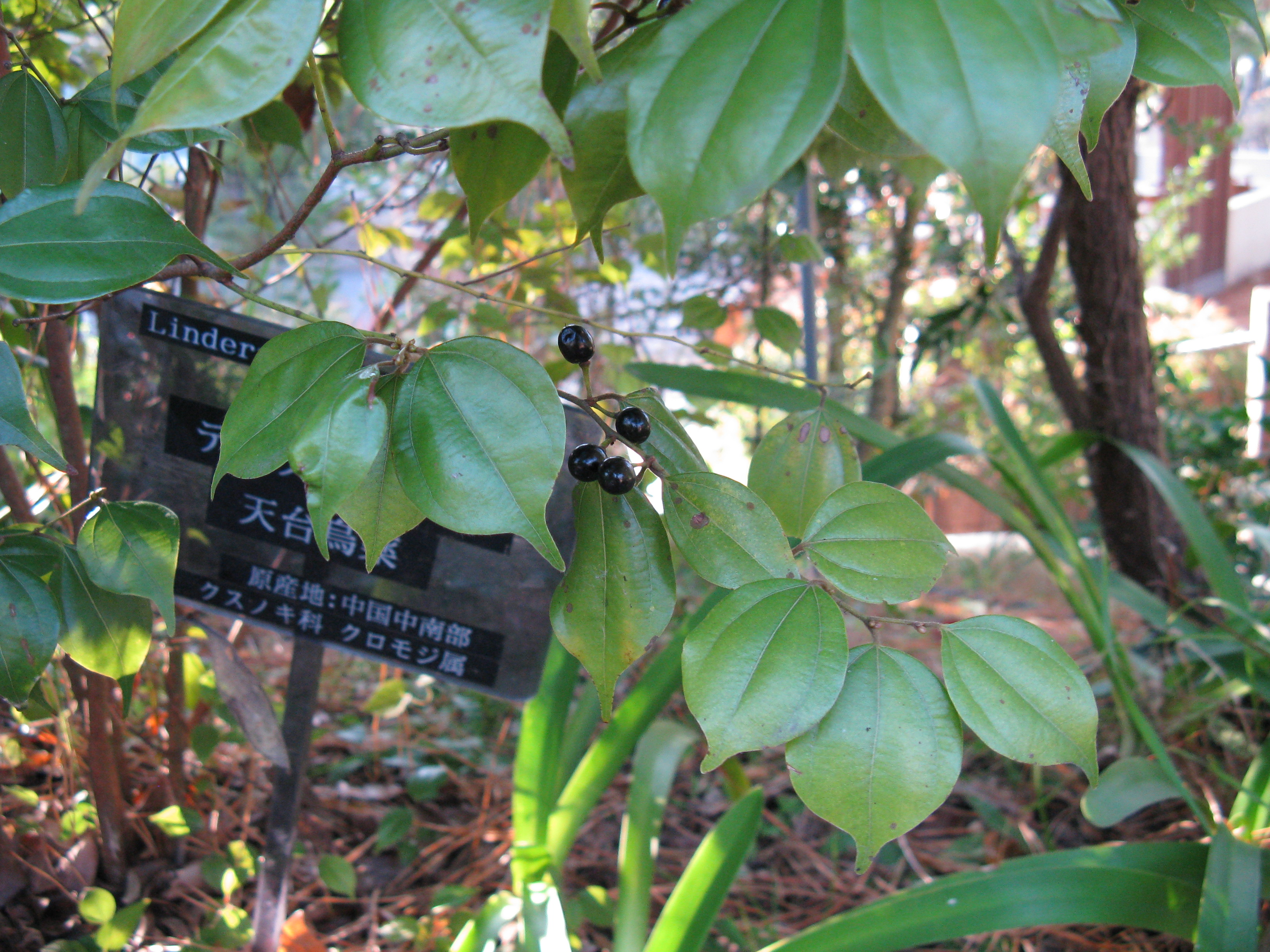

Conservation status
- Least Concern (IUCN 3.1)

Scientific classification
- Kingdom: Plantae
- Clade: Tracheophytes
- Clade: Angiosperms
- Clade: Magnoliids
- Order: Laurales
- Family: Lauraceae
- Genus: Lindera
- Species: L. aggregata

Binomial name
- Lindera aggregata (Sims) Kosterm.

Varieties
- Lindera aggregata var. aggregata; Lindera aggregata var. playfairii (Hemsl.) H.P.Tsui

Synonyms
- Cinnamomum aggregatum (Sims) Pilip.; Laurus aggregata Sims; synonyms of var. aggregata: Benzoin sinense (Blume) Kuntze; Benzoin strychnifolium (Siebold & Zucc. ex Blume) Kuntze; Daphnidium myrrha Siebold & Zucc.; Daphnidium sinense Blume; Daphnidium strychnifolium Siebold & Zucc. ex Blume; Lindera eberhardtii Lecomte; Lindera sinensis (Blume) Hemsl.; Lindera strychnifolia (Siebold & Zucc. ex Blume) Fern.-Vill.; Litsea trinervia Bürger ex Blume; synonyms of var. playfairii: Lindera aggregata f. playfairii (Hemsl.) J.C.Liao; Lindera playfairii (Hemsl.) C.K.Allen; Litsea playfairii Hemsl.; Neolitsea playfairii (Hemsl.) Chun

= Lindera aggregata =

Species of flowering plant

Lindera aggregata is a species of flowering plant in the family Lauraceae. It is a tree native to southern China, Hainan, Taiwan, Vietnam, and the Philippines.

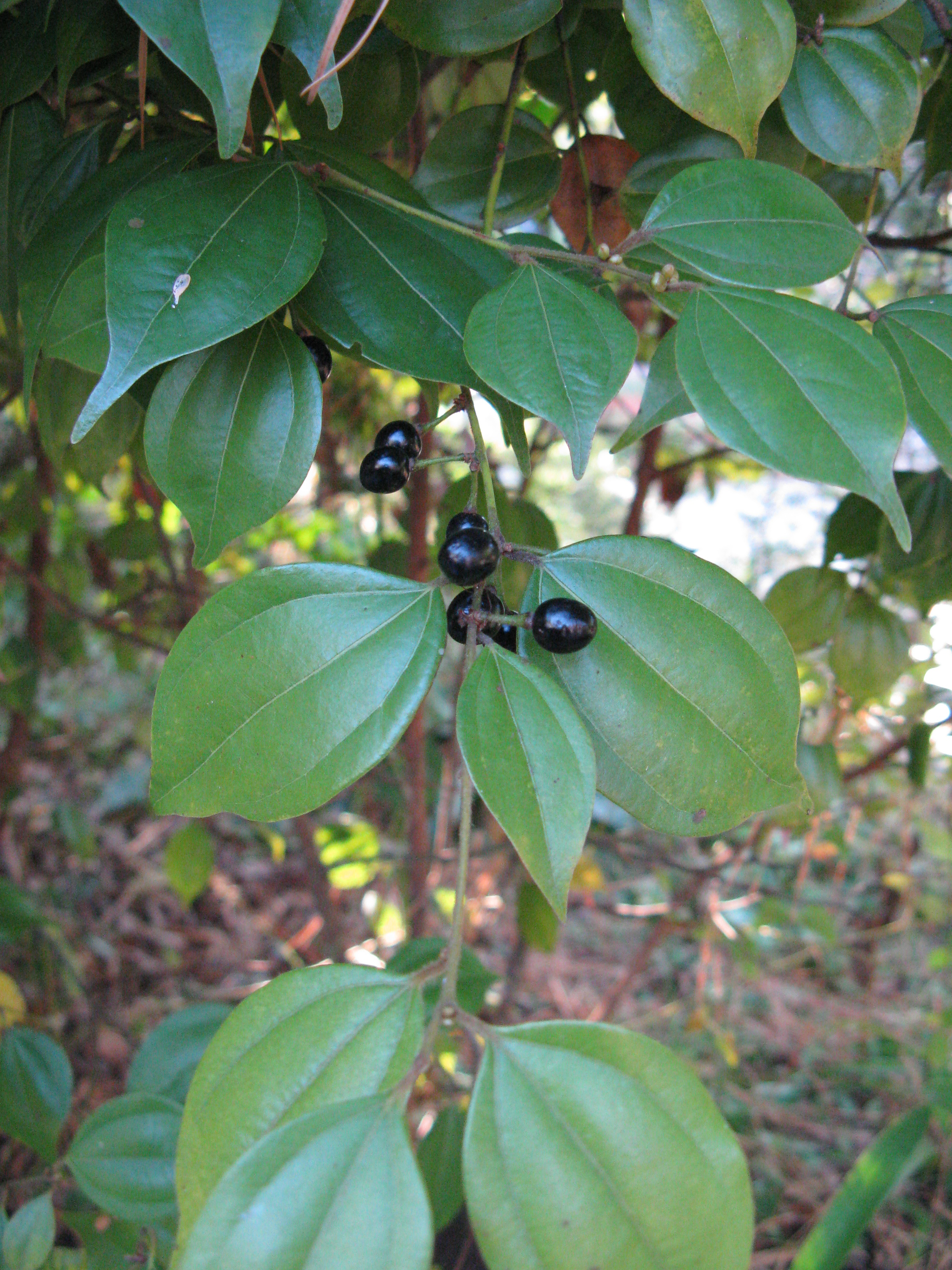
Closeup view on fruits

== Other names ==
Engl.: evergreen lindera, Japanese evergreen spicebush.
TCM: trad. 烏藥, simpl. 乌药 or 乌乐, pinyin: wūyào.

== Varieties ==
Two varieties are accepted:

- Lindera aggregata var. aggregata – southern China, Hainan, Taiwan, Vietnam, and the Philippines
- Lindera aggregata var. playfairii (Hemsl.) H.P.Tsui – southeastern China (Guangxi and Guangdong), Hainan, and northern Vietnam

== Use ==
乌药, radix lindera, is present in the Compendium of Materia Medica and Kampo herb list. It is an ingredient in the traditional Chinese medicine pill Chaihu Shugan Wan against "stagnation of liver qi, distension of chest and hypochondria, indigestion, and acid eructation", and in the Lindera Combination Teapills (simpl. 天台乌药丸, trad. 天臺烏藥丸, pinyin : tiāntái wūyào wán), a Chinese classic herbal formula.

== Biochemistry ==
An A type proanthocyanidin trimer (epicatechin-(4β→8,2β→O→7)-entcatechin-(4β-8)-catechin) can be found in Lindera aggregata. In a study this compound showed cytoprotective action against ethanol-induced gastric injury in Sprague-Dawley rats.

Four alkaloids (boldine, norboldine, reticuline and linderegatine) can also be found in L. aggregata.
