= Plzeň Zoo =

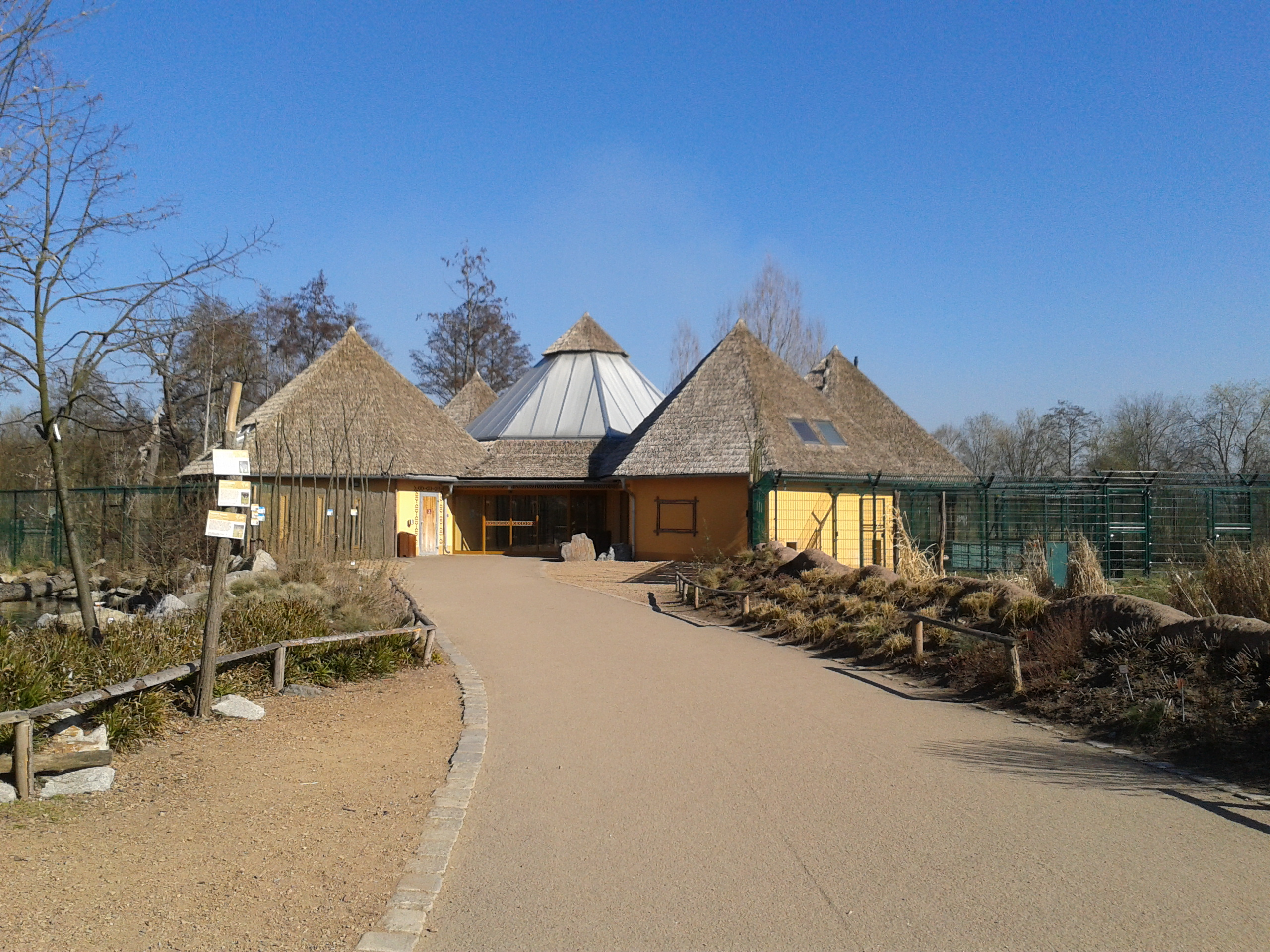
- Pavilion of cheetah, pygmy hippopotamus and bee-eaters
- Interactive map of Plzeň Zoo
- 49°45′28″N 13°21′36″E
- Date opened: 1926
- Location: Pod Vinicemi 9, 301 16 Plzeň 1
- Land area: 21 hectares
- No. of animals: 6 500
- No. of species: 1 300
- Memberships: EEP, EAZA
- Website: zooplzen.cz

Plzeň Zoo (Zoologická a botanická zahrada města Plzně) is a Czech zoo, located in Plzeň in Czech Republic. After Liberec Zoo it is the second oldest zoo in the Czech Republic, founded in 1926 on the river banks of the river Radbuza.

Plzen zoo has 40 species of animals from EEP European Endangered Species Programme and is responsible for the European studbook for Dwarf and Thick tailed Maki.

== Gallery ==
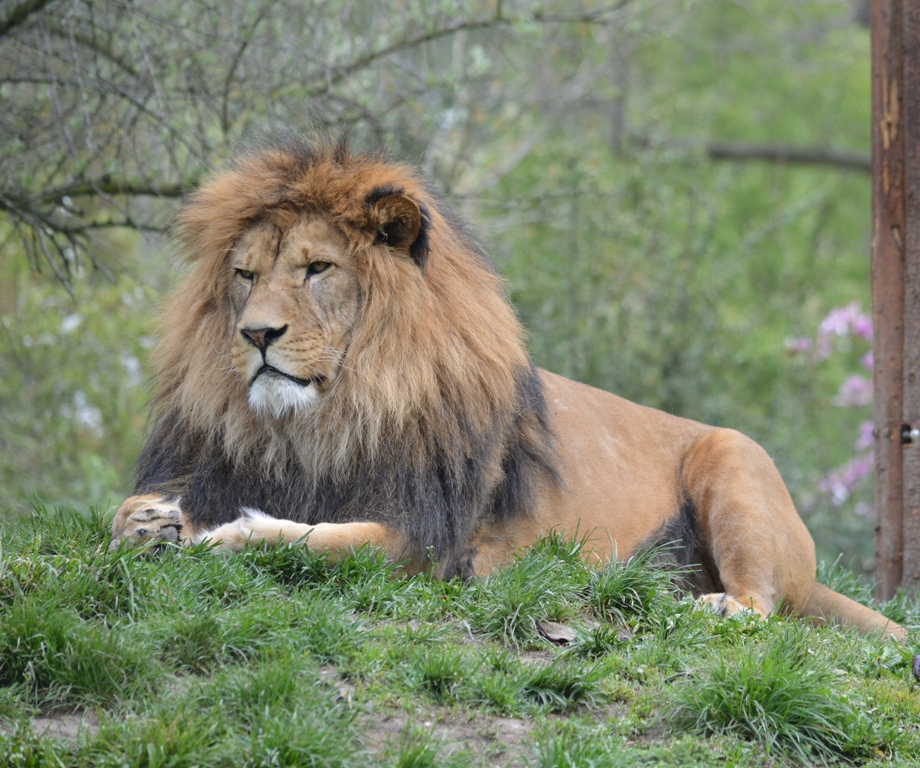
A lion, possibly of the subspecies Panthera leo leo

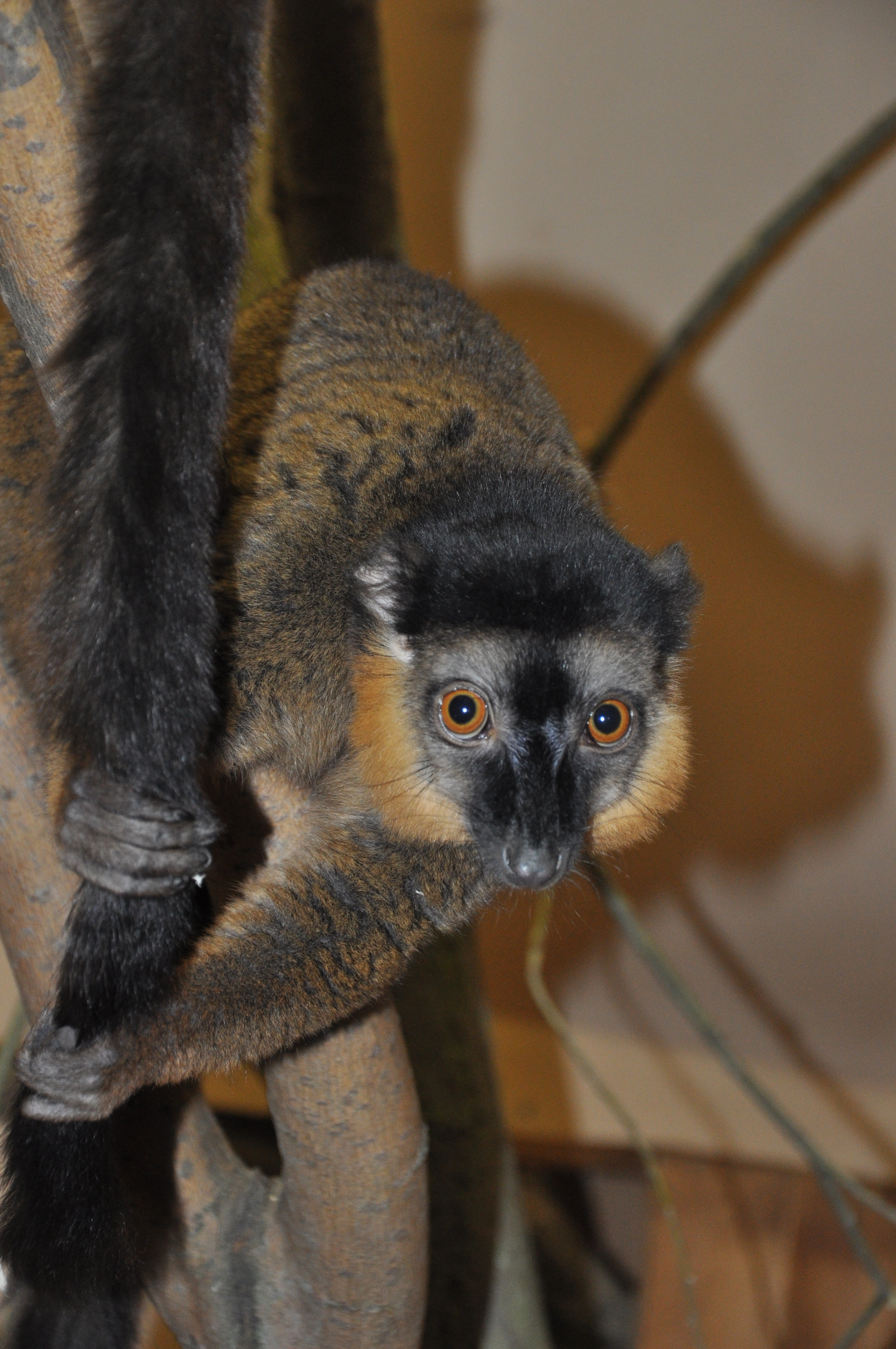
Plzeň Zoo breeds many species of lemur.
