= Steven Earl Clemants =

American botanist (1954–2008)

- Born: 22 July 1954; Lincoln, Nebraska
- Died: 2 November 2008 (aged 54); New York City
- Scientific career
- Fields: Botany, plant systematics
- Author abbrev. (botany): Clemants

Steven Earl Clemants (1954–2008) was an American botanist and Vice President for Science at the Brooklyn Botanic Garden. He was a graduate faculty member of both Rutgers University and the City University of New York, and a long time member and former President of the Torrey Botanical Society.

== Works ==
- Steven Clemants; Carol Gracie (27 April 2006). Wildflowers in the Field and Forest: A Field Guide to the Northeastern United States. OUP USA. ISBN 978-0-19-515005-6.
