= Sergei Mosyakin =

Ukrainian botanist

Sergei Leonidovich Mosyakin
- Born: 30 November 1961 (age 64)
- Scientific career
- Fields: Botany, plant systematics
- Author abbrev. (botany): Mosyakin

Sergei Leonidovich Mosyakin (born 30 November 1963) is a Ukrainian botanist.

== Biography ==
Born on November 30, 1961, in Kyiv.

From 1978 to 1983, he studied at the Kyiv State Pedagogical Institute (now known as the National Pedagogical Drahomanov University), specializing in Biology and Foreign Languages.

After completing his studies, he entered the graduate school of the Kholodny Institute of Botany.

From 1988 to 1991, he worked as a junior researcher, and since 1991, he has been the head of the Department of Plant Systematics and Floristics. Since December 2008, he has served as the director of the institute.

== Bibliography ==
- ——; Mykola M. Fedoronchuk (1999). Vascular Plants of Ukraine: A Nomenclatural Checklist. National Academy of Sciences of Ukraine. ISBN 978-966-02-1336-4.
