= Nornuciferine =

Clinical data
- Other names: 15781; 1,2-Dimethoxynoraporphine; N-Nornuciferine
- Drug class: Serotonin 5-HT_{2C} receptor agonist
- ATC code: None

Identifiers
- IUPAC name: 1,2-dimethoxy-5,6,6a,7-tetrahydro-4H-dibenzo[de,g]quinoline
- CAS Number: 54750-04-8
- PubChem CID: 624491
- ChemSpider: 542509
- UNII: XUR3H4VB7J
- CompTox Dashboard (EPA): DTXSID40203210

Chemical and physical data
- Formula: C_{18}H_{19}NO_{2}
- Molar mass: 281.355 g·mol^{−1}
- 3D model (JSmol): Interactive image
- SMILES: COC1=C(C2=C3C(CC4=CC=CC=C42)NCCC3=C1)OC
- InChI: InChI=1S/C18H19NO2/c1-20-15-10-12-7-8-19-14-9-11-5-3-4-6-13(11)17(16(12)14)18(15)21-2/h3-6,10,14,19H,7-9H2,1-2H3; Key:QQKAHDMMPBQDAC-UHFFFAOYSA-N

Nornuciferine, also known as 15781 or as 1,2-dimethoxynoraporphine, is a noraporphine alkaloid found in Nelumbo nucifera and a serotonin 5-HT_{2C} receptor agonist related to the aporphine alkaloid nuciferine. It is the N-desmethyl analogue of nuciferine. The drug has been found to act as a selective partial agonist of the serotonin 5-HT_{2C} receptor, with an EC_{50} of 653 nM and an E_{max} of 66% in terms of G_{q} signaling. Conversely, it was inactive as an agonist of the serotonin 5-HT_{2A} and 5-HT_{2B} receptors, but did show weak antagonism of these receptors at high concentrations. The serotonin 5-HT_{2C} receptor agonism of nornuciferine was described by Bingjie Zhang and colleagues in 2020.

== See also ==
- Aporphine alkaloid
- Asimilobine
- 11-Chloroasimilobine
- 11-Methoxyasimilobine
- MQ02-439
