= C18H17NO3 =

The molecular formula C_{18}H_{17}NO_{3} (molar mass: 295.33 g/mol, exact mass: 295.1208 u) may refer to:

- Indobufen
- Oliveroline
- Pukateine
- Xylopine
