= Apomorphine (data page) =

Chemical data page

This is a page of data for apomorphine.

The complete data for Apomorphine
General information
Chemical formula: C_{17}H_{17}NO_{2}
Molar mass: 267.322 ^{b} g·mol^{−1}
Systematic name:
5,6,6a,7-tetrahydro-6-methyl-4H-dibenzo[de,g]quinolin-10,11-diol (?) ^{a}
Synonyms:
6-methyl-6aβ-noraporphine-10,11-diol
6a-β-aporphine-10,11-diol
Apomorfin
D004
N-methylnorapomorphine
Database data
SMILES: CN1CCC2=CC=CC3=C2C1CC4=C3C(=C(C=C4)O)O ^{c}
InChI=1/C17H17NO2/c1-18-8-7-10-3-2-4-12-15(10)13(18)9-11-5-6-14(19)17(20)16(11)12/h2-6,13,19-20H,7-9H2,1H3 ^{d}

ATC: N04BC07	CAS: 58-00-4	DrugBank: APRD00531	EINECS: N/A	PubChem: 6005 ^{e}

Physical properties

Structure	Crystal data	Spectral data: UV-Vis / IR / NMR / MS

Phase behavior	Solid properties	Liquid properties	Gas properties

Hazard properties

MSDS N/A	Main hazards: N/A	NFPA 704	Flash point: N/A	RTECS number: N/A

Chemical properties

XLogP: 3.03 ^{f}	pI:	pK_{a}:	Tautomers: 18 ^{g}	Hydrogen bond: donor - 2 ^{h}; acceptor - 3 ^{i}

Pharmacological properties

This box:
- Except where noted otherwise, data relate to Standard temperature and pressure.
- Reliability of data general note.
