= Anonaine =

Names
- IUPAC name 1,2-[Methylenebis(oxy)]-12-nor-6aβ-aporphine
- Systematic IUPAC name (7aR)-6,7,7a,8-Tetrahydro-2H,5H-benzo[g][1,3]benzodioxolo[6,5,4-de]quinoline

Identifiers
CAS Number	1862-41-5 (R)-(-)-Anonaine; 7241-00-1 (±)-Anonaine
3D model (JSmol)	Interactive image
ChemSpider	141120
PubChem CID	160597
CompTox Dashboard (EPA)	DTXSID00171865
- InChI: InChI=1S/C17H15NO2/c1-2-4-12-10(3-1)7-13-15-11(5-6-18-13)8-14-17(16(12)15)20-9-19-14/h1-4,8,13,18H,5-7,9H2/t13-/m1/s1
- SMILES: C1CN[C@@H]2CC3=CC=CC=C3C4=C2C1=CC5=C4OCO5

Properties
Chemical formula	C_{17}H_{15}NO_{2}
Molar mass	265.312 g·mol^{−1}
Melting point	122–123 °C (252–253 °F; 395–396 K)
- Except where otherwise noted, data are given for materials in their standard state (at 25 °C [77 °F], 100 kPa). Infobox references

Anonaine is a bioactive noraporphine, present in members of the plant families Magnoliaceae and Annonaceae It is named after the plant it was first extracted from, Annona reticulata, which is commonly known as Anona.

== Extraction from Annonaceae ==
The alkaloid was first isolated from the bark of the Annona reticulata. It has since been found in Annona squamosa, the leaves of Michelia × alba, Fissistigma latifolium and Goniothalamus australis, among many others. The compound may be obtained by dry roasting the bark of Annona reticulata and extracting with methanol. The methanol is removed and the resulting syrup is then treated with hydrochloric acid and the insoluble salts filtered off. The filtrate can then made basic with NH_{4}OH and extracted with diethyl ether. Shaking the extract with 5% sodium hydroxide and retaining the organic layer removes the phenolic content of the extract. The hydrogen chloride salt is then obtained by mixing with hydrochloric acid and recrystallized from diethyl ether. The free base can then be obtained. The anonaine content of Annona reticulata is approximately 0.12%, based on the weight of the starting dried bark.

== Research ==
=== Traditional medicines ===
Anonaine is found in many species of Annonacae, which have been used as traditional medicines for many years. For example, extracts of Annona squamosa have been used as treatments for epilepsy, dysentery, cardiac problems, worm infection, constipation, bacterial infection, fever and ulcers. It appears, however, that anonaine is not active in the treatment of many of these ailments. Studies into the bioactivity of anonaine have revealed various interesting pharmacological activities including antitumour, vasorelaxation, antioxidative, antiparasitic and antimicrobial effects, as well as having an effect on the central nervous system.

=== Anti-tumour properties ===
Anonaine is known to inhibit growth in human cervical cancer and human lung carcinoma H1299 cells in vitro. The mechanism by which anonaine induces apoptosis in these cells is believed to occur by several mechanisms: generation of nitric oxidereactive oxygen species, reduction in intracellular glutathione concentration, activation of caspases and apoptosis-related proteins, and damage to DNA.

=== Antidepressant properties ===
Anonaine also displays intense dopamine-uptake inhibitory properties, which can lead to a potential anti-depressant activity.

== Synthesis ==
The starting material is called 5-{2-Nitrobenzyl}-5,6,7,8-tetrahydro[1,3]dioxolo[4,5-g]isoquinoline, PC56692289 (1). It is formed via the amide formation between homopiperonylamine and o-Nitrophenylacetyl chloride [22751-23-1], followed by subsequent Pictet–Spengler reaction.

Treatment with benzoyl chloride gives the amide (2). The reduction of both the benzoyl group and the nitro group occurs in one step by reduction with diborane to give the benzyl aniline (3). Sandmeyer reaction of the diazonium salt leads to N-benzyl-anonaine, PC171976373 (4). Catalytic hydrogenation cleaves the N-benzyl protecting group, completing the synthesis of anonaine (5).

Biosynthesis:

N-Methyl-Anonaine is called Roemerine. The synthesis pathway can be expected to follow a similar course but the starting material would be Homarylamine.

== See also ==
- Apomorphine – a related chemical used in the treatment of Parkinson's disease
- Aporphine – the core alkaloid
- Nuciferine
- Pukateine
