= C20H21NO2 =

The molecular formula C_{20}H_{21}NO_{2} (molar mass: 307.38 g/mol) may refer to:

- Moxaverine, a drug used to treat functional gastrointestinal disorders
- MDO-NPA
- 2-Hydroxy-11-(2-methylallyl)oxynoraporphine
