= C19H21NO4 =

The molecular formula C_{19}H_{21}NO_{4} (molar mass : 327.37 g/mol) may refer to:

- Acetylmorphone, a semi-synthetic opiate analogue
- Boldine
- Isoteolin (isoboldine)
- 3-Monoacetylmorphine
- 6-Monoacetylmorphine
- Naloxone
- (+)-Naloxone
- Salutaridine
- Scoulerine
- Stepholidine
