= C17H9NO3 =

The molecular formula C_{17}H_{9}NO_{3} (molar mass: 275.258 g/mol) may refer to:

- Liriodenine
- 3-Nitrobenzanthrone (3-nitro-7H-benz[de]anthracen-7-one)
