= Propylnorapomorphine =

Chemical compound

Clinical data
- Routes of administration: Oral
- ATC code: none

Legal status
- Legal status: In general: uncontrolled

Identifiers
- IUPAC name: (6aS)-6-propyl-5,6,6a,7-tetrahydro-4H-dibenzo[de,g]quinoline-10,11-diol
- CAS Number: 57559-68-9
- PubChem CID: 5311191
- ChemSpider: 4470712
- UNII: AZ9L8ZYZ3A

Chemical and physical data
- Formula: C_{19}H_{21}NO_{2}
- Molar mass: 295.382 g·mol^{−1}
- 3D model (JSmol): Interactive image
- Density: 1.2 g/cm^{3}
- Boiling point: 446 to 536 °C (835 to 997 °F)
- SMILES: CCCN1CCC2=CC=CC3=C2C1CC4=C3C(=C(C=C4)O)O

N-n-Propylnorapomorphine (NPA) is an aporphine derivative dopamine agonist closely related to apomorphine. In rodents it has been shown to produce hyperactivity, stereotypy, hypothermia, antinociception, and penile erection, among other effects. Notably, its effects on locomotion are biphasic, with low doses producing inhibition and catalepsy and high doses resulting in enhancement of activity. This is likely due to preferential activation of D_{2}/D_{3} autoreceptors versus postsynaptic receptors, the latter of which overcomes the former to increase postsynaptic dopaminergic signaling only with high doses.

== See also ==
- Apomorphine
- MDO-NPA
