= Asimilobine =

Names
- IUPAC name 1-Methoxy-12-nor-6aβ-aporphin-2-ol
- Systematic IUPAC name (6aR)-1-methoxy-5,6,6a,7-tetrahydro-4H-dibenzo[de,g]quinolin-2-ol
- Other names 1857; (R)-Asimilobine; (R)-1-Methoxy-2-hydroxynoraporphine

Identifiers
| CAS Number | 6871-21-2 |
| 3D model (JSmol) | Interactive image |
| ChEBI | CHEBI:70637 |
| ChEMBL | ChEMBL469423 |
| ChemSpider | 23282723 |
| PubChem CID | 160875 |
| UNII | Q4H26TGS8S |
| CompTox Dashboard (EPA) | DTXSID101045654 |
- InChI: InChI=1S/C17H17NO2/c1-20-17-14(19)9-11-6-7-18-13-8-10-4-2-3-5-12(10)16(17)15(11)13/h2-5,9,13,18-19H,6-8H2,1H3/t13-/m1/s1 Key: NBDNEUOVIJYCGZ-CYBMUJFWSA-N
- SMILES: COC1=C(C=C2CCN[C@H]3C2=C1C4=CC=CC=C4C3)O

Properties
| Chemical formula | C_{17}H_{17}NO_{2} |
| Molar mass | 267.328 g·mol^{−1} |
- Except where otherwise noted, data are given for materials in their standard state (at 25 °C [77 °F], 100 kPa). Infobox references

Asimilobine, also known as (R)-1-methoxy-2-hydroxynoraporphine, is a noraporphine alkaloid with various known pharmacological actions. It has been found to act as a selective biased partial agonist of the serotonin 5-HT_{2C} receptor, with an EC_{50} of 308 nM and E_{max} of 86% for activation of G_{q} signaling and no β-arrestin2 recruitment. Conversely, asimilobine was inactive as an agonist of the serotonin 5-HT_{2A} and 5-HT_{2B} receptors, but did show weak antagonism of these receptors at very high concentrations (IC_{50} = >10,000 nM). Derivatives and analogues of asimilobine with more potent serotonin 5-HT_{2C} receptor agonism, such as 11-chloroasimilobine, have been studied and described. In addition, derivatives with dual highly potent serotonin 5-HT_{2A} and 5-HT_{2C} receptor agonism, such as 11-methoxyasimilobine, have been described.

(RS)-Asimilobine.

Although asimilobine is inactive as an agonist of the serotonin 5-HT_{2A} and 5-HT_{2C} receptors, the racemic form of the compound has been found to act as an agonist of the serotonin 5-HT_{2A}, 5-HT_{2B}, and 5-HT_{2C} receptors, with EC_{50} (E_{max}) values of 318 nM (55%), 794 nM (25%), and 51 nM (94%), respectively. The 1-propoxy homologue shows more potent serotonin 5-HT_{2A} and 5-HT_{2B} receptor agonism and less potent serotonin 5-HT_{2C} receptor agonism (EC_{50} (E_{max}) = 43 nM (91%), 53 nM (81%), and 197 nM (98%), respectively).

== See also ==
- Noraporphine
- Aporphine alkaloid
- Nornuciferine
- 11-Chloroasimilobine
- 11-Methoxyasimilobine
- MQ02-439
