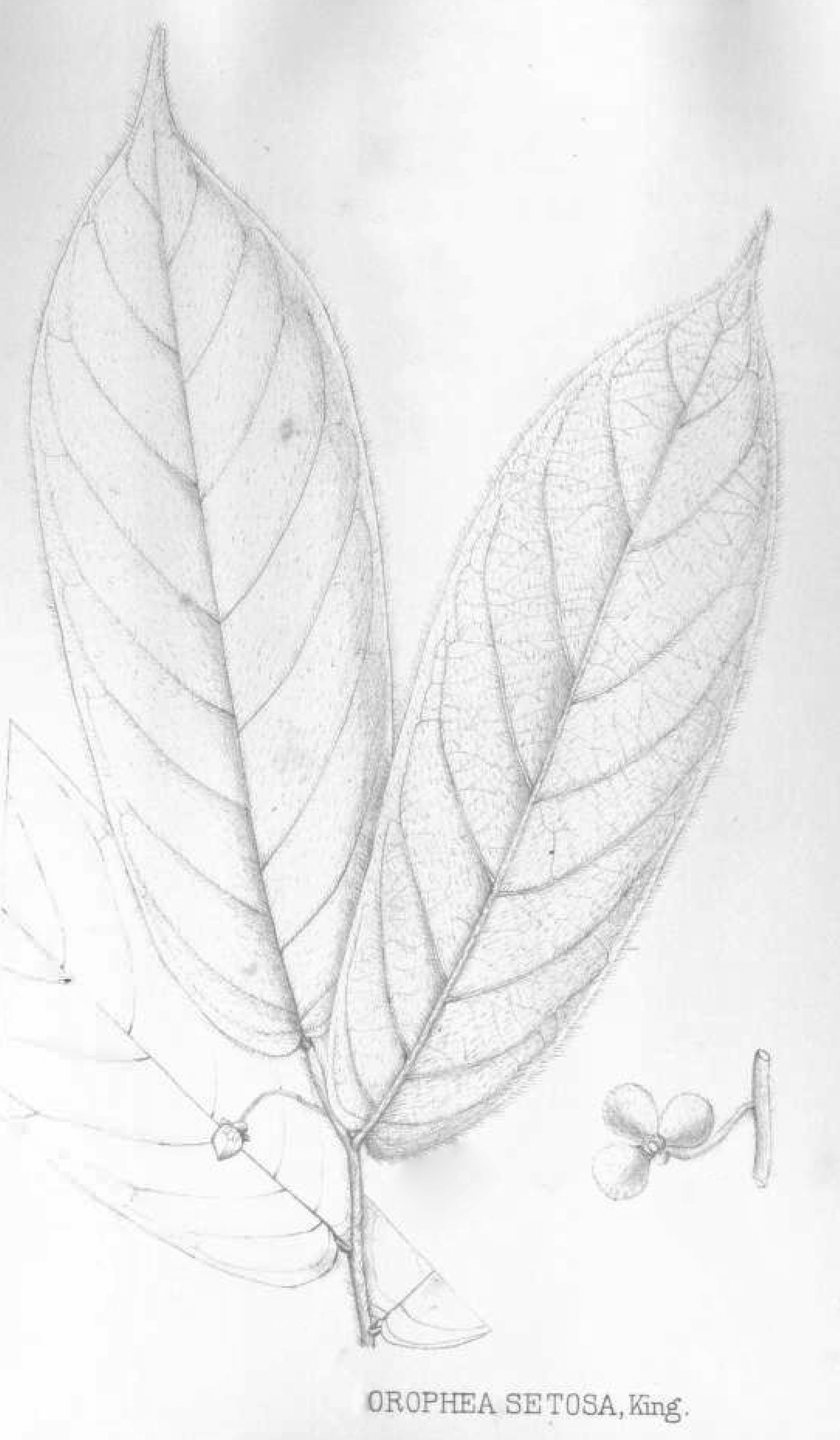
- Botanical illustration of Pseuduvaria setosa using the synonym Orophea setosa

Conservation status
- Least Concern (IUCN 3.1)

Scientific classification
- Kingdom: Plantae
- Clade: Embryophytes
- Clade: Tracheophytes
- Clade: Spermatophytes
- Clade: Angiosperms
- Clade: Magnoliids
- Order: Magnoliales
- Family: Annonaceae
- Genus: Pseuduvaria
- Species: P. setosa

Binomial name
- Pseuduvaria setosa (King) J.Sinclair

Synonyms
- Orophea setosa King; Orophea setigera Ridl.; Pseuduvaria setosa var. major J.Sinclair

= Pseuduvaria setosa =

Species of plant in the soursop family

Pseuduvaria setosa is a species of plant in the family Annonaceae. It is native to Peninsular Malaysia and Peninsular Thailand. George King, the botanist who first formally described the species under the basionym Orophea setosa, named it after the bristly (setosus in Latin) hairs on its leaves and petioles.

== Description ==
It is a tree reaching 7 meters (23 ft) in height. The young, brown to dark brown branches are very densely hairy, but become hairless as they mature. Its elliptical to egg-shaped, papery to slightly leathery leaves are 7.5–26 centimeters. The leaves have rounded to heart-shaped bases and tapering tips, with the tapering portion 4–19 millimeters long. The leaves are sparsely to densely hairy on their upper and lower surfaces and fringed with long hairs at their margins. The midribs of the leaves are variably hairy on their upper side, and very densely covered in erect bristly hairs on their lower side. The leaves have 10–18 pairs of secondary veins emanating from their midribs. Its petioles, when present, are 5 by 0.7–3 millimeters, very densely covered in erect bristly hairs, and have a broad groove on their upper side. Its solitary Inflorescences occur on branches, and are organized on very densely hairy peduncles that are 1–3 by 0.3–0.8 millimeters. Each inflorescence has 1–2 flowers. Each flower is on a very densely hairy pedicel that is 8–24 by 0.3–0.6 millimeters. The pedicels are organized on a rachis up to 5 millimeters long that have 2–3 bracts. The pedicels have a medial, very densely hairy bract that is 0.5–1.5 millimeters long. Its flowers are unisexual. Its flowers have 3 triangular sepals that are fused at their base. The sepals are 0.8–2 by 1–2 millimeters. The sepals are hairless on their upper surface, densely hairy on their lower surface, and hairy at their margins. Its 6 petals are arranged in two rows of 3. The cream-colored to pale yellow, oval to elliptical, outer petals are 2–4 by 2.4 millimeters with hairless upper and densely hairy lower surfaces. The heart-shaped inner petals have a 2.5–4 millimeter long claw at their base and a 5.5–9 by 3.5–6.5 millimeter blade. The claw and base of the blade are red, turning to cream-colored or pale yellow at the tip. The inner petals have slightly heart-shaped bases and pointed tips. The inner petals are densely hairy on their upper and lower surfaces. The inner petals have 1–2 distinct mushroom-shaped, smooth glands on their upper surface. Male flowers have 60–76 stamens that are 0.8–1 by 0.5–0.8 millimeters. Female flowers have 3–4 carpels that are 1.3–2.4 by 0.8–1.3 millimeters. Each carpel has 2–8 ovules arranged in a row. Female flowers can have up to 10 sterile stamens, but they do not occur in all flowers. The fruit occur in clusters of 1–7 on sparsely hairy pedicles that are 10–30 by 0.5–2.5 millimeters. The pedicels are attached to densely hairy peduncles that are 4 by 1–1.5 millimeters. The yellow-green, globe-shaped fruit are 6–25 by 6–20 millimeters. The fruit are smooth, and very densely hairy. Each fruit has 1–8 hemispherical to lens-shaped seeds that are 10–13 by 4.5–10.5 by 3.5–7.5 millimeters. The seeds are very wrinkly.

=== Reproductive biology ===
The pollen of P. setosa is shed as permanent tetrads.

== Habitat and distribution ==
It has been observed growing on limestone granite substrates, in lowland evergreen forests at elevations of 50–400 meters (160–1,310 ft).

== Uses ==
Bioactive compounds, including the alkaloid liriodenine, extracted from its aerial tissues have been observed in laboratory tests to have antimycobacterial activity against Mycobacterium tuberculosis, antimalarial activity against Plasmodium falciparum, and cytotoxicity to cultured human cancer cell lines.
