= Noraporphine =

Noraporphine structure.

Noraporphines are a class of chemical compounds related to the aporphine alkaloids like nuciferine and glaucine and synthetic aporphines like apomorphine. They are N-desmethyl analogues of the aporphines. Some noraporphines are alkaloids similarly to aporphines, for instance nornuciferine and asimilobine occurring naturally in Nelumbo nucifera and other plants.

Some noraporphines, such as asimilobine, nornuciferine, MQ02-439 (1-methoxynoraporphine), and 11-chloroasimilobine, have been found to act as potent and selective serotonin 5-HT_{2C} receptor agonists. Others, such as racemic asimilobine, 1-propoxy-2-hydroxynoraporphine, 11-methoxyasimilobine, 2-hydroxy-11-propoxynoraporphine, and 2-hydroxy-11-(2-methylallyl)oxynoraporphine, have been found to act as potent mixed serotonin 5-HT_{2A} and 5-HT_{2C} receptor agonists. Conversely, aporphines, like nuciferine, dicentrine, isolaureline, and crebanine, tend to be antagonists or very weak partial agonists of the serotonin 5-HT_{2A} and/or 5-HT_{2C} receptors, although exceptions with higher efficacy such as glaucine are known.

Chemical structures of selected noraporphines
Noraporphine

Asimilobine

Nornuciferine

Anonaine

Laurelliptine

Norglaucine

Xylopine

MQ02-439 (1-methoxynoraporphine)

1-Propoxy-2-hydroxynoraporphine

11-Chloroasimilobine

11-Methoxyasimilobine

2-Hydroxy-11-propoxynoraporphine

2-Hydroxy-11-(2-methylallyl)oxynoraporphine

Many other noraporphine alkaloids are also known, including norlaureline, puterine, norstephalagine, norisocorydine, nordicentrine, norboldine (laurolistine), norpurpureine, norpredicentrine, laetanine, oduocine, norannuradhapurine, nornantenine, and norushinsunine (michelalbine), among others.

== See also ==
- Aporphine alkaloid
- List of miscellaneous serotonin 5-HT_{2A} receptor agonists
