= C20H21NO4 =

The molecular formula C_{20}H_{21}NO_{4} (molar mass: 339.38 g/mol) may refer to:

- Canadine
- Dicentrine, an alkaloid
- Nantenine, an alkaloid
- Papaverine, an opium alkaloid used primarily in the treatment of visceral spasm
