= MQ02-439 =

Clinical data
- Other names: 1-Methoxynoraporphine; Compound 18b
- Drug class: Serotonin 5-HT_{2C} receptor agonist
- ATC code: None

Identifiers
- IUPAC name: 1-methoxy-5,6,6a,7-tetrahydro-4H-dibenzo[de,g]quinoline
- PubChem CID: 172460286
- ChemSpider: 88296408
- ChEMBL: ChEMBL5417234

Chemical and physical data
- Formula: C_{17}H_{17}NO
- Molar mass: 251.329 g·mol^{−1}
- 3D model (JSmol): Interactive image
- SMILES: COC1=C2C3=CC=CC=C3CC4C2=C(CCN4)C=C1
- InChI: InChI=1S/C17H17NO/c1-19-15-7-6-11-8-9-18-14-10-12-4-2-3-5-13(12)17(15)16(11)14/h2-7,14,18H,8-10H2,1H3; Key:MHHVBPCYYCUVPT-UHFFFAOYSA-N

MQ02-439, also known as 1-methoxynoraporphine, is a serotonin 5-HT_{2C} receptor agonist of the noraporphine family. It is a potent and selective full agonist of the serotonin 5-HT_{2C} receptor, with an EC_{50} (E_{max}) of 103 nM (96%). The drug showed no activation of the serotonin 5-HT_{2A} and 5-HT_{2C} receptors at concentrations of up to 10,000 nM. However, it did show weak antagonism of these two receptors. The chemical synthesis of MQ02-439 has been described. Various analogues of MQ02-439 have also been described, including some with potent serotonin 5-HT_{2A} receptor agonist activity. The (S)- enantiomer of MQ02-439 is known as MQ02-592 and is the more potent enantiomer in terms of serotonin 5-HT_{2C} receptor agonism. MQ02-439 was described in the scientific literature by Qi Mao and colleagues in 2020.

== See also ==
- Noraporphine
- 11-Chloroasimilobine
- 2-Hydroxy-11-(2-methylallyl)oxynoraporphine
- Nornuciferine
- Asimilobine
- 11-Methoxyasimilobine
