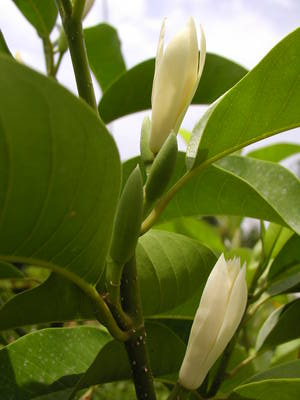

Scientific classification
- Kingdom: Plantae
- Clade: Tracheophytes
- Clade: Angiosperms
- Clade: Magnoliids
- Order: Magnoliales
- Family: Magnoliaceae
- Genus: Magnolia
- Subgenus: Magnolia subg. Yulania
- Section: Magnolia sect. Michelia
- Subsection: Magnolia subsect. Michelia
- Species: M. × alba

Binomial name
- Magnolia × alba (DC.) Figlar

Synonyms
- Michelia longifolia Blume; Michelia × alba DC. (basionym); Sampacca × longifolia (Blume) Kuntze

= Magnolia × alba =

Species of tree

Magnolia × alba, also known as the white champaca, white sandalwood, or white jade orchid tree, is a hybrid flowering plant that is commonly cultivated in Southeast Asia and tropical regions of East Asia. Although the exact origin is uncertain, it is considered to be a hybrid of Magnolia champaca and Magnolia montana.

== Names ==
The current name of the white champaca is derived from its local name in Indonesian, Cempaka Putih or Bunga Kantil.

The white champaca is known by various names in English including pak lan in Hawaii from the Cantonese transcription of 白蘭. Horticultural trade names used in the United States include the taxonomic synonym Michelia alba to fanciful ones such as 'white fragrant himalayan champaca'.

Names in other languages include kantil in Javanese.

In Taiwan, the tree and specifically the flower, is known as 玉蘭花 (yü lan hua).

== Description ==
Magnolia × alba matures to 30 meters with evergreen leaves; the flowers have a count of 12 tepals.

== Uses ==
Magnolia × alba is widely cultivated as an ornamental in Asia, particularly tropical and subtropical regions of China and Southeast Asia for the strongly fragrant flowers.

In Taiwan, the flowers are plucked from trees before they open and bunches of them are strung together on wire, to be sold at roadside to truck and taxi drivers. The flowers remain fragrant for several days, before wilting and being disposed of.

In Indonesia, the pleasantly fragrant flower is used and arranged together with Jasminum sambac as flower garland, especially wore by brides during traditional wedding ceremony. The flowers are similarly used in Thailand, where they are worn as traditional wedding garlands by the bride and groom.

An essential oil is extracted from the flowers. In China, where it is known as bai lan (白蘭), the flowers are used to prepare yulan tea. In traditional Chinese medicine, the flowers are used to move qi and relieve cough.

== Gallery ==
Images of Magnolia × alba
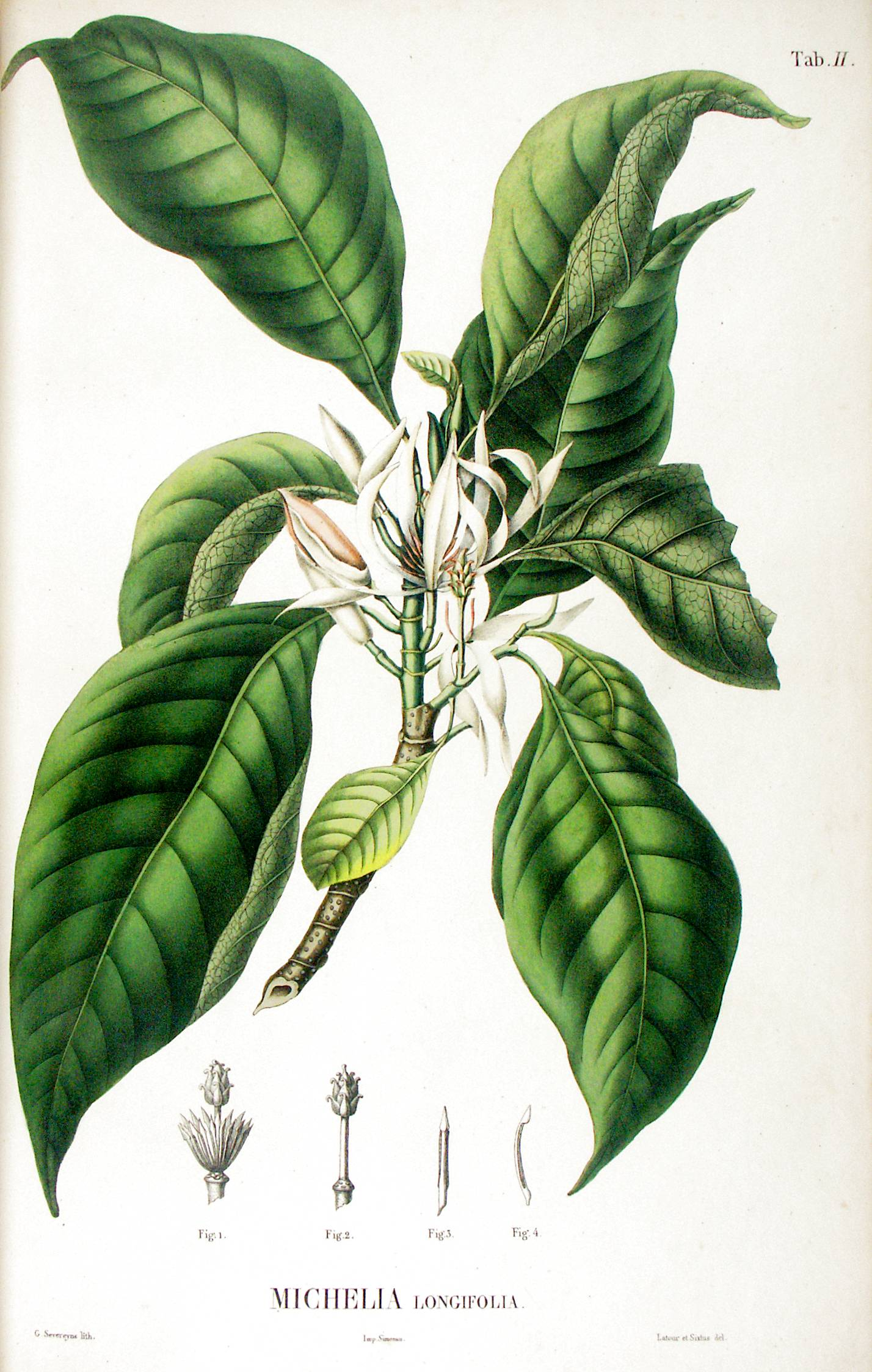
An illustration as depicted in Flora Javae; Magnolia × alba was first classified as Michelia Longifolia [sic] (BLUME, 1829)

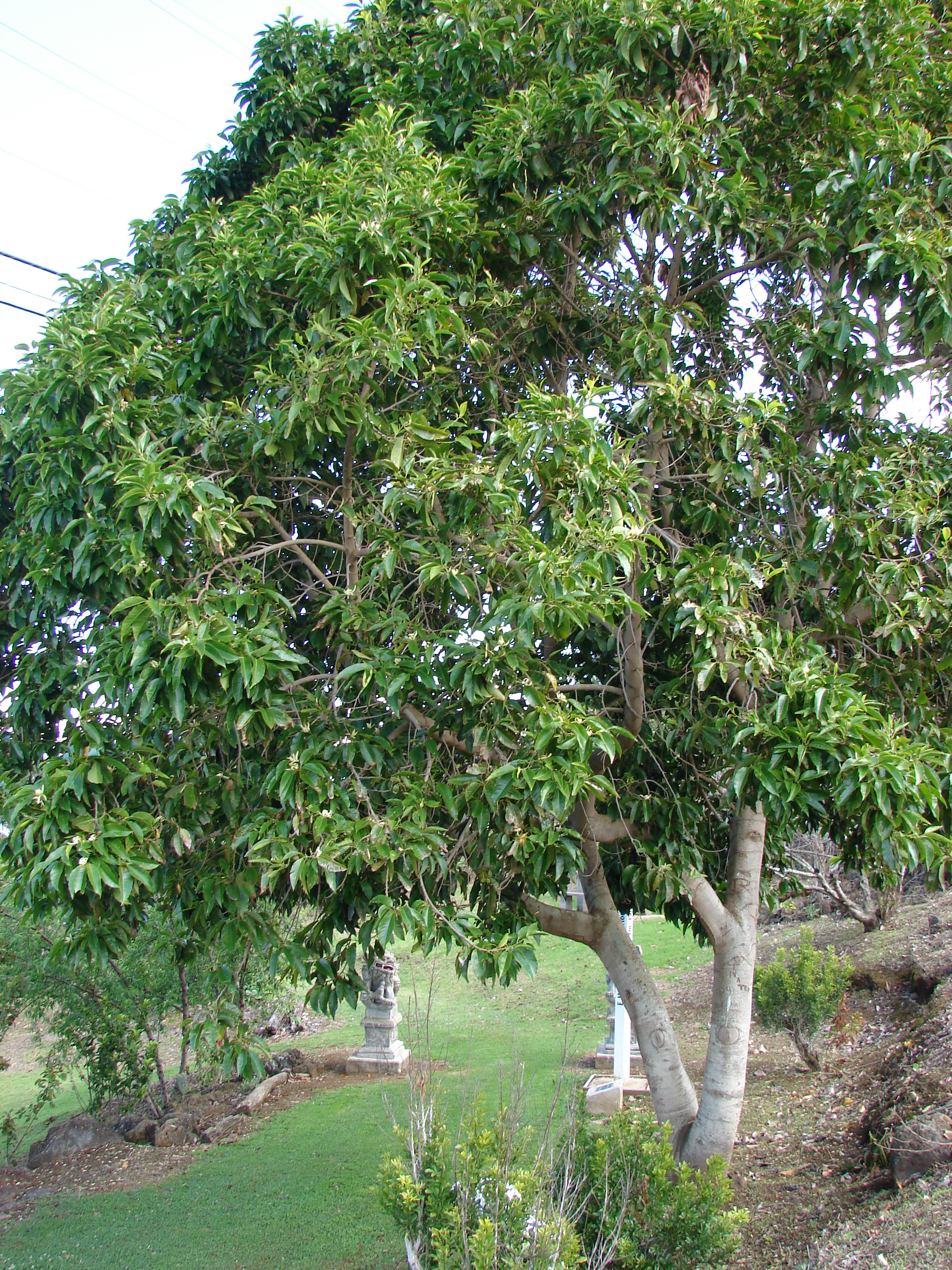
A garden specimen as grown in Maui, Hawaii

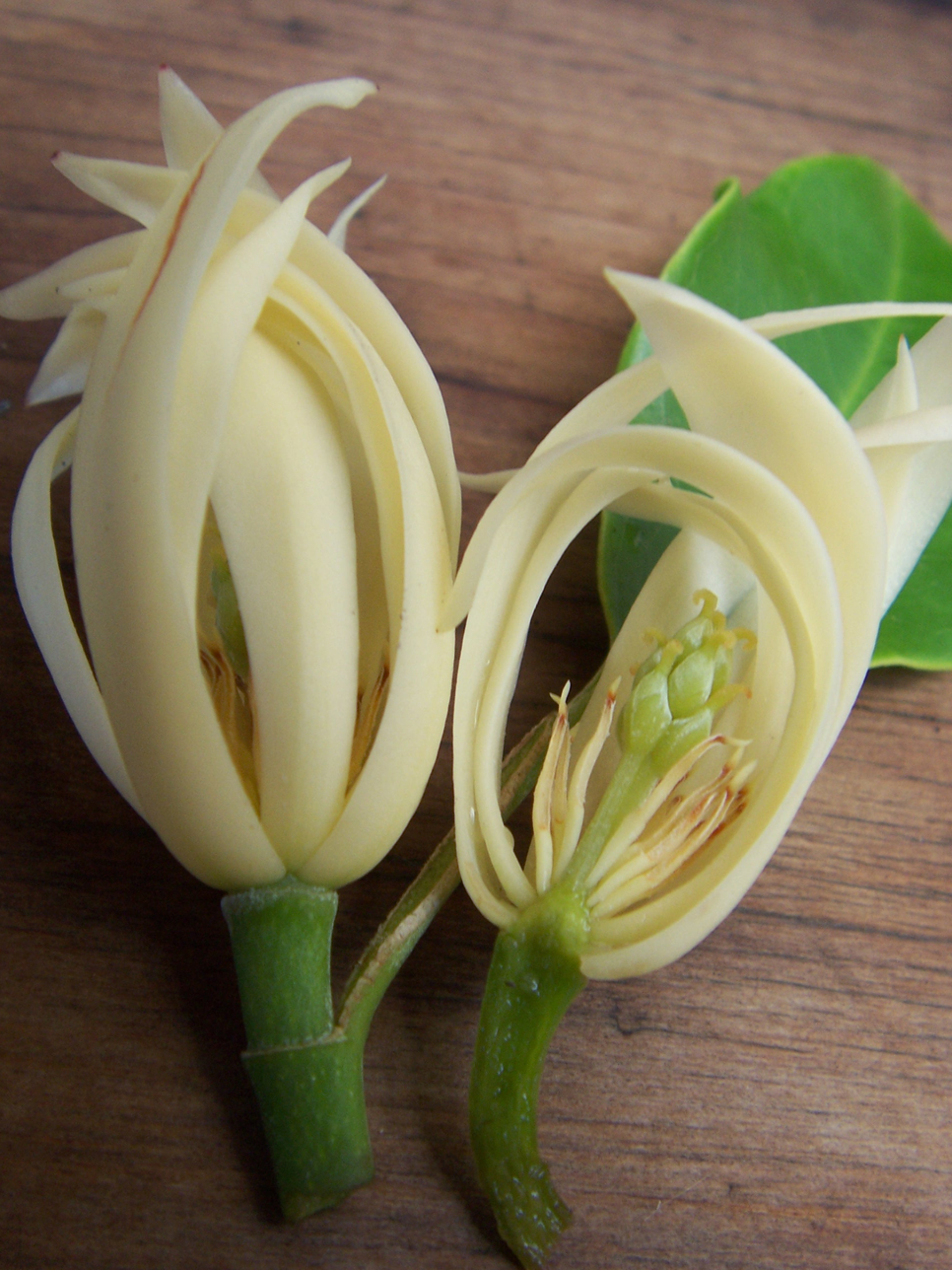
A dissected view of a flower presenting the stamens and carpels of which appear characteristic of the genus

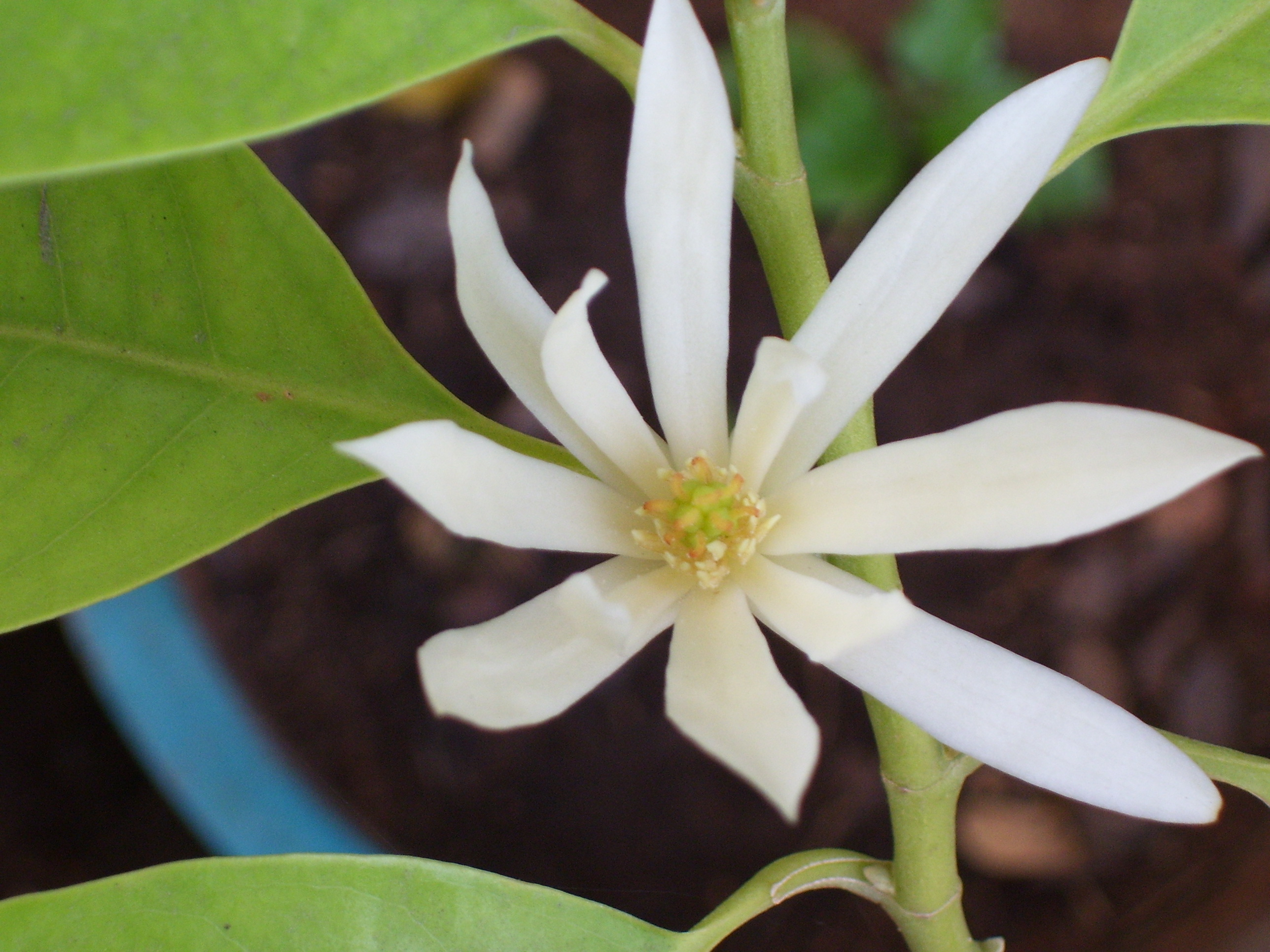
A top view of a flower at climax; the flowers of M. × alba are noted for their fragrance

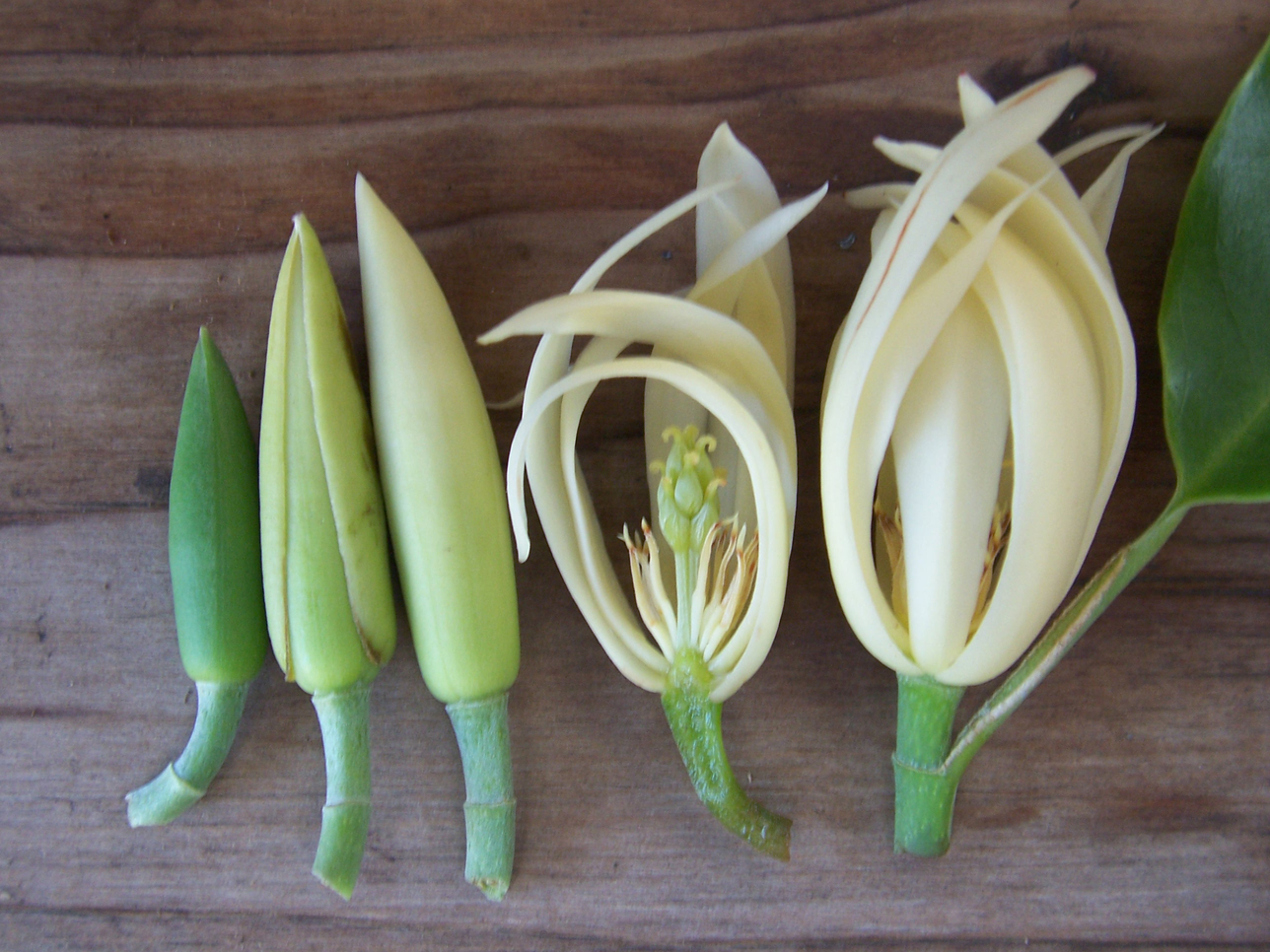
Several stages of the bud and flower; note: this image does not depict complete graduation

== Alkaloids ==
Ushinsunine (aka Micheline A) [3175-89-1] is an aporphine alkaloid contained within Michelia alba. Norushinsunine (aka Michelalbine) [3175-84-6] is a noraporphine alkaloid also contained in this plant.
