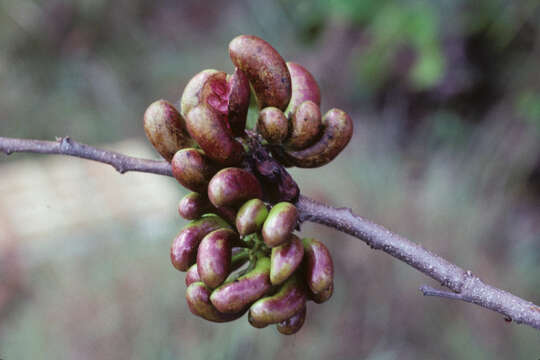
- Fruit of Xylopia discreta

Conservation status
- Least Concern (IUCN 3.1)

Scientific classification
- Kingdom: Plantae
- Clade: Embryophytes
- Clade: Tracheophytes
- Clade: Spermatophytes
- Clade: Angiosperms
- Clade: Magnoliids
- Order: Magnoliales
- Family: Annonaceae
- Genus: Xylopia
- Species: X. discreta

Binomial name
- Xylopia discreta (L.f.) Sprague & Hutch.

Synonyms
- Habzelia discreta (L.f.) A.DC. Unona discreta L.f. Uvaria unona Forsyth f. Xylopia salicifolia Kunth

= Xylopia discreta =

Species of flowering plant

Xylopia discreta is a species of plant in the Annonaceae family. It is native to Brazil, Colombia, French Guiana, Guyana, Suriname, and Venezuela. Carl Linnaeus the Younger, the botanist who first formally described the species using the basionym Unona discreta, named it after its purple, aromatic fruit which set it apart (discretus in Latin) from other members of the family.

== Description ==
It is a tree reaching 22 meters in height. Its young branches are silky, narrow, and pliable. The lance-shaped, hairless, papery leaves are in two rows, alternate. Its petioles very short. The flower pedicels are clustered in umbels. The fruit are purple and aromatic.

=== Reproductive biology ===
The pollen of Xylopia discreta is shed as permanent tetrads.

=== Distribution and habitat ===
It has been observed growing in forests.

== Uses ==
Bioactive compounds extracted from its leaves and seeds have been reported to have antileishmanial activity in laboratory tests.

== Alkaloids ==
Alkaloids contained in Xylopia discreta consist of Xylopine, Xylopinin, Discretin, Discretinin (aka Corypalmine) & Discretamin (aka Scoulerine & Aequaline).
