= MDO-NPA =

Dopaminergic drug

Identifiers
- IUPAC name: (12R)-10,11-Methylenedioxy-N-propylnoraporphine
- CAS Number: 81264-57-5 113678-73-2
- PubChem CID: 133642
- ChemSpider: 117885
- ChEMBL: ChEMBL4470553
- CompTox Dashboard (EPA): DTXSID201001887

Chemical and physical data
- Formula: C_{20}H_{21}NO_{2}
- Molar mass: 307.393 g·mol^{−1}
- 3D model (JSmol): Interactive image
- SMILES: CCCN1CCC2=C3[C@H]1CC4=C(C3=CC=C2)C5=C(C=C4)OCO5
- InChI: InChI=1S/C20H21NO2/c1-2-9-21-10-8-13-4-3-5-15-18(13)16(21)11-14-6-7-17-20(19(14)15)23-12-22-17/h3-7,16H,2,8-12H2,1H3/t16-/m1/s1; Key:YSONYEIWWIFWEV-MRXNPFEDSA-N

MDO-NPA (10,11-methylenedioxy-N-n-propylnoraporphine) is a synthetic aporphine derivative used as a research tool in neuropharmacology. It was developed as a methylenedioxy prodrug of N-n-propylnorapomorphine (NPA). A noteworthy advantage that the MDO-NPA congener has over NPA and apomorphine is that MDO-NPA has a high oral bioavailability, whereas the other two do not and must be delivered via subcutaneous injection or intraperitoneally.

== Pharmacology ==
=== Pharmacokinetics ===
In vivo O-dealkylation releases NPA, yielding an orally effective, relatively long-acting dopaminergic agent that acts at central dopamine receptors. Evidence for this prodrug behavior includes blockade of MDO-NPA’s behavioral effects and prevention of NPA formation by the microsomal oxidase inhibitor SKF-525A.

=== Pharmacodynamics ===
In animal models, MDO-NPA produces robust dopamine-mediated behavioral effects with “depot-like” properties, and across studies has shown dose-dependent agonist/antagonist interactions and, for certain stereoisomers, limbic-selective actions. MDO-NPA exists as two distinct enantiomers. One of these enantiomers is active as a dopamine agonist while the other is active as a dopamine antagonist.

MDO-NPA has not been developed as a therapeutic drug and remains primarily of experimental interest alongside related aporphine congeners.

== See also ==
- MDMA
- MDA
- Propylnorapomorphine
- UWA-001
- Piribedil
- Anonaine
