= Domesticine =

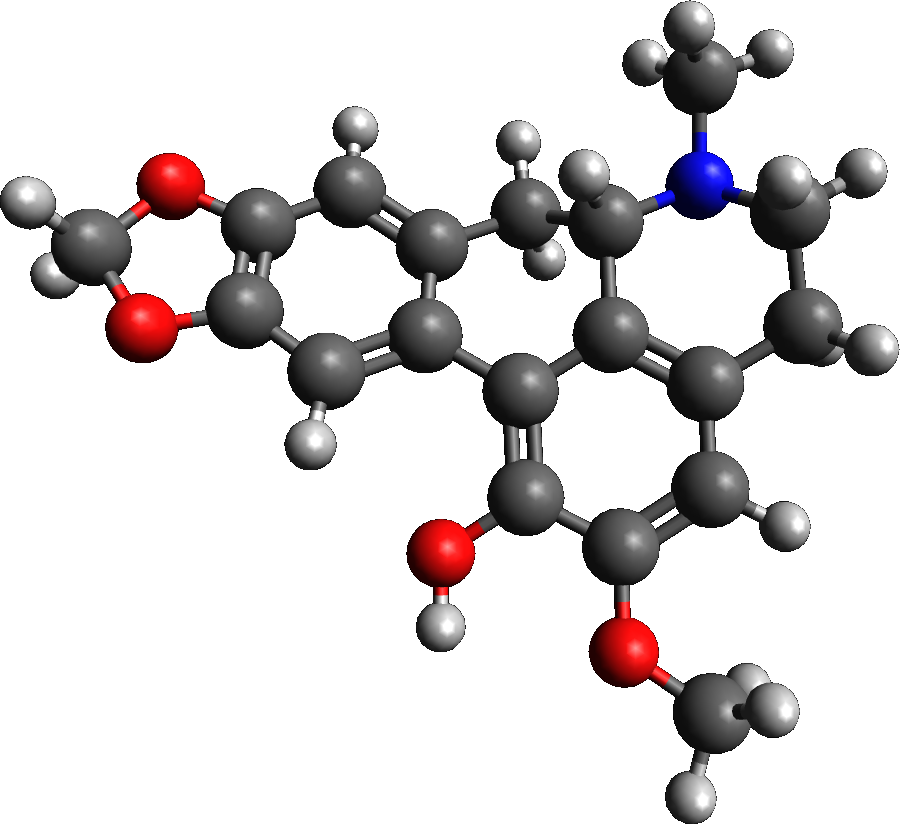

Names
- IUPAC name 2-Methoxy-2′H-[1,3]dioxolo[4′,5′:9,10]aporphin-1-ol
- Systematic IUPAC name (6aS)-2-Methoxy-6-methyl-5,6,6a,7-tetrahydro-4H,10H-benzo[de][1,3]benzodioxolo[5,6-g]quinolin-1-ol

Identifiers
| CAS Number | 476-71-1 |
| 3D model (JSmol) | Interactive image |
| ChemSpider | 144307 |
| PubChem CID | 164611 |
| UNII | 96P7649HX8 |
| CompTox Dashboard (EPA) | DTXSID50197217 |
- InChI: InChI=1S/C19H19NO4/c1-20-4-3-10-6-16(22-2)19(21)18-12-8-15-14(23-9-24-15)7-11(12)5-13(20)17(10)18/h6-8,13,21H,3-5,9H2,1-2H3/t13-/m0/s1 Key: ZMNSHBTYBQNBPV-ZDUSSCGKSA-N
- SMILES: CN1CCC2=CC(=C(C3=C2[C@@H]1CC4=CC5=C(C=C43)OCO5)O)OC

Properties
| Chemical formula | C_{19}H_{19}NO_{4} |
| Molar mass | 325.364 g·mol^{−1} |
- Except where otherwise noted, data are given for materials in their standard state (at 25 °C [77 °F], 100 kPa). Infobox references

Domesticine is an α_{1D}-adrenergic receptor antagonist. The compound belongs to the group of aporphine alkaloids.
