= 11-Methoxyasimilobine =

Clinical data
- Other names: 1,11-Dimethoxy-2-hydroxynoraporphine; Compound 16l; Compound S31
- Drug class: Serotonin 5-HT_{2} receptor agonist; Serotonin 5-HT_{2A} receptor agonist; Serotonin 5-HT_{2C} receptor agonist
- ATC code: None

Identifiers
- IUPAC name: 1,11-dimethoxy-5,6,6a,7-tetrahydro-4H-dibenzo[de,g]quinolin-2-ol
- PubChem CID: 175794276

Chemical and physical data
- Formula: C_{18}H_{19}NO_{3}
- Molar mass: 297.354 g·mol^{−1}
- 3D model (JSmol): Interactive image
- SMILES: COC1=CC=CC2=C1C3=C4C(C2)NCCC4=CC(=C3OC)O
- InChI: InChI=1S/C18H19NO3/c1-21-14-5-3-4-10-8-12-15-11(6-7-19-12)9-13(20)18(22-2)17(15)16(10)14/h3-5,9,12,19-20H,6-8H2,1-2H3; Key:IRZSTYZUXGRZIR-UHFFFAOYSA-N

11-Methoxyasimilobine, also known as 1,11-dimethoxy-2-hydroxynoraporphine, is a serotonin 5-HT_{2} receptor agonist of the noraporphine family related to the noraporphine alkaloid asimilobine. It is the 11-methoxy derivative of asimilobine.

Whereas asimilobine is a selective, lower-potency, high-efficacy partial agonist of the serotonin 5-HT_{2C} receptor, 11-methoxyasimilobine is a highly potent and selective full agonist of both the serotonin 5-HT_{2A} and 5-HT_{2C} receptors, with approximately 8-fold preferential activation of the serotonin 5-HT_{2C} receptor over the serotonin 5-HT_{2A} receptor. Its EC_{50} (E_{max}) values were 18 nM (98%) at the serotonin 5-HT_{2A} receptor and 2.3 nM (100%) at the serotonin 5-HT_{2C} receptor. The drug is a biased agonist of the serotonin 5-HT_{2C} receptor, favoring G_{q} signaling over β-arrestin recruitment by approximately 6.3-fold. It was among the most potent dual serotonin 5-HT_{2A} and 5-HT_{2C} receptor agonists of a large series of assessed noraporphines.

Besides the serotonin 5-HT_{A} and 5-HT_{2C} receptors, the drug also showed weak agonism of the serotonin 5-HT_{2B} receptor, but only at very high concentrations (EC_{50} = >10,000 nM). It showed little activity at a selection of other serotonin receptors.

The chemical synthesis of 11-methoxyasimilobine has been described. A variety of analogues of the drug with similar activity have also been described.

11-Methoxyasimilobine was described in the scientific literature by Wangzhi Qin and colleagues in 2025. It had previously been patented in 2022. There is interest in 11-methoxyasimilobine and related compounds for potential medical use, such as treatment of anxiety, obsessive–compulsive disorder (OCD), and substance use disorders.

== See also ==
- Noraporphine
- Asimilobine
- 11-Chloroasimilobine
- 2-Hydroxy-11-(2-methylallyl)oxynoraporphine
