= 2-Hydroxy-11-(2-methylallyl)oxynoraporphine =

Clinical data
- Other names: "Compound 20s"; "Compound S30"
- Drug class: Serotonin 5-HT_{2A} receptor agonist; Serotonin 5-HT_{2C} receptor agonist
- ATC code: None

Identifiers
- IUPAC name: 11-(2-methylprop-2-enoxy)-5,6,6a,7-tetrahydro-4H-dibenzo[de,g]quinolin-2-ol
- PubChem CID: 175794278

Chemical and physical data
- Formula: C_{20}H_{21}NO_{2}
- Molar mass: 307.393 g·mol^{−1}
- 3D model (JSmol): Interactive image
- SMILES: CC(=C)COC1=CC=CC2=C1C3=CC(=CC4=C3C(C2)NCC4)O
- InChI: InChI=1S/C20H21NO2/c1-12(2)11-23-18-5-3-4-13-9-17-19-14(6-7-21-17)8-15(22)10-16(19)20(13)18/h3-5,8,10,17,21-22H,1,6-7,9,11H2,2H3; Key:QBPVUNKTSFWCKO-UHFFFAOYSA-N

2-Hydroxy-11-(2-methylallyl)oxynoraporphine is a serotonin 5-HT_{2A} and 5-HT_{2C} receptor agonist of the noraporphine family. It is a synthetic compound and is an analogue of aporphine alkaloids like nuciferine, but shows agonism rather than antagonism of serotonin 5-HT_{2} receptors.

It is a potent full agonist or high-efficacy partial agonist of the serotonin 5-HT_{2A} and 5-HT_{2C} receptors. The drug's EC_{50} (E_{max}) values were 6.3 to 9.4 nM (83–84%) at the serotonin 5-HT_{2A} receptor and 8.0 to 9.8 nM (95–103%) at the serotonin 5-HT_{2C} receptor. It showed no agonistic activity at the serotonin 5-HT_{2B} receptor at concentrations of up to 30,000 nM. 2-Hydroxy-11-(2-methylallyl)oxynoraporphine was among the most potent serotonin 5-HT_{2A} receptor agonists of a large series of assessed noraporphines.

The chemical synthesis of 2-hydroxy-11-(2-methylallyl)oxynoraporphine has been described. A variety of analogues of the drug with similar activity have also been described.

2-Hydroxy-11-(2-methylallyl)oxynoraporphine was first described in the scientific literature by Wangzhi Qin and colleagues in 2025. It had previously been patented in 2022.

== See also ==
- List of miscellaneous serotonin 5-HT_{2A} receptor agonists
- Aporphine alkaloids
- 11-Chloroasimilobine
- MQ02-439
- (S)-Glaucine
