= Apomorphine =

Chemical compound

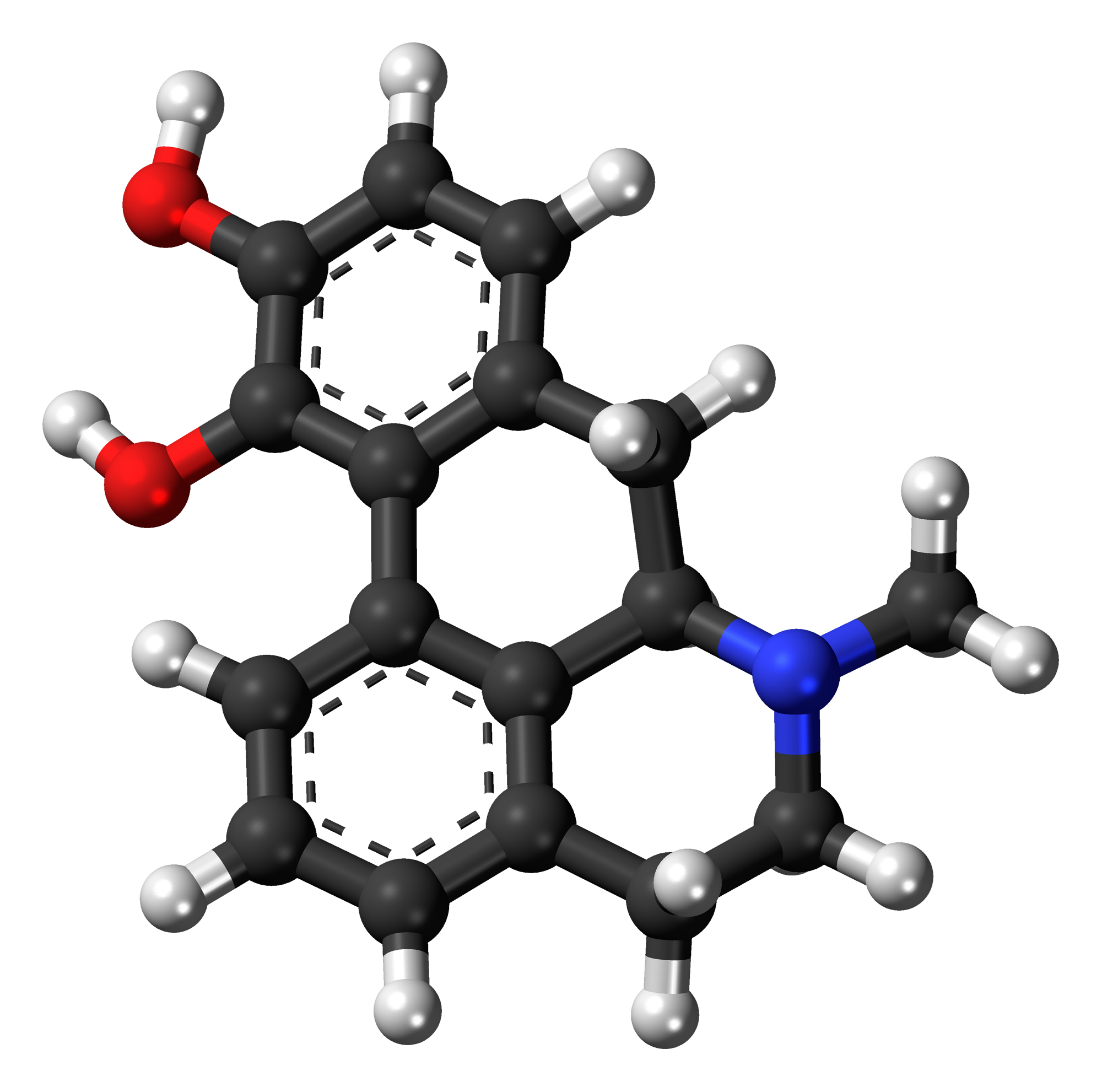

Clinical data
- Trade names: Apokyn, Kynmobi
- AHFS/Drugs.com: Monograph
- MedlinePlus: a604020
- License data: US DailyMed: Apomorphine
- Pregnancy category: AU: B3
- Routes of administration: Subcutaneous, sublingual
- ATC code: G04BE07 (WHO) N04BC07 (WHO) QV03AB95 (WHO)

Legal status
- Legal status: AU: S4 (Prescription only); CA: ℞-only; UK: POM (Prescription only); US: ℞-only; In general: ℞ (Prescription only)

Pharmacokinetic data
- Bioavailability: 100% following injection
- Protein binding: ~50%
- Metabolism: Liver, phase II
- Onset of action: 10–20 min
- Elimination half-life: 40 minutes
- Duration of action: 60–90 min
- Excretion: Liver

Identifiers
- IUPAC name: (6aR)-6-methyl-5,6,6a,7-tetrahydro-4H-dibenzo[de,g]quinoline-10,11-diol
- CAS Number: 58-00-4; HCl: 41372-20-7
- PubChem CID: 6005
- IUPHAR/BPS: 33
- DrugBank: DB00714
- ChemSpider: 5783
- UNII: N21FAR7B4S; HCl: F39049Y068
- KEGG: D07460
- ChEBI: CHEBI:48538
- ChEMBL: ChEMBL53
- CompTox Dashboard (EPA): DTXSID8022614
- ECHA InfoCard: 100.000.327

Chemical and physical data
- Formula: C_{17}H_{17}NO_{2}
- Molar mass: 267.328 g·mol^{−1}
- 3D model (JSmol): Interactive image
- SMILES: OC1=C(O)C(C2=CC=CC3=C2[C@@H](C4)N(C)CC3)=C4C=C1
- InChI: InChI=1S/C17H17NO2/c1-18-8-7-10-3-2-4-12-15(10)13(18)9-11-5-6-14(19)17(20)16(11)12/h2-6,13,19-20H,7-9H2,1H3/t13-/m1/s1; Key:VMWNQDUVQKEIOC-CYBMUJFWSA-N

Data page
- Apomorphine (data page)

Apomorphine, sold under the brand name Apokyn among others, is a type of aporphine that functions as a non-selective dopamine agonist which activates both D_{2}-like and, to a much lesser extent, D_{1}-like receptors. It also acts as an antagonist of 5-HT_{2} and α-adrenergic receptors with high affinity. The compound is an alkaloid belonging to Nymphaea caerulea (blue lotus), but is also historically known as a morphine decomposition product made by boiling morphine with concentrated acid, hence the -morphine suffix. Contrary to its name, apomorphine does not actually contain morphine or its skeleton, nor does it bind to opioid receptors. The apo- prefix relates to it being a morphine derivative ("[comes] from morphine").

Historically, apomorphine has been tried for a variety of uses, including as a way to relieve anxiety and craving in alcoholics, an emetic (to induce vomiting), for treating stereotypies (repeated behaviour) in farmyard animals, and more recently in treating erectile dysfunction. Currently, apomorphine is used in the treatment of Parkinson's disease. It is a potent emetic and should not be administered without an antiemetic such as domperidone. The emetic properties of apomorphine are exploited in veterinary medicine to induce therapeutic emesis in canines that have recently ingested toxic or foreign substances.

Apomorphine was used to treat a variety of maladies, including to induce vomiting in cases of poisoning, to relieve bronchitis and other respiratory illnesses, as an aversive conditioner in substance abuse treatment, to quell mania or anxiety, to treat erectile dysfunction, and to treat various movement disorders, among others. There are conflicting studies about the drug's efficacy in treating addiction.

== Medical uses ==
=== Parkinson's disease ===
Apomorphine is used for the management of motor fluctuations in Parkinson's disease, particularly for the treatment of "off" episodes. "Off" episodes are periods during which motor symptoms such as rigidity, bradykinesia, or reduced mobility reemerge as the effects of dopaminergic medications wear off. Apomorphine can provide rapid improvement in motor symptoms.

=== Available forms ===
Apomorphine is administered subcutaneously, by intermittent injection or continuous infusion, or sublingually, generally as an adjunct to levodopa-based therapy in patients with Parkinson's disease and motor fluctuations.

Intermittent subcutaneous injection is used to terminate "off" episodes in patients whose motor fluctuations are not adequately controlled with oral therapy. A narrative review reported that sublingual apomorphine film produces rapid off-to-on conversion and clinically meaningful short-term improvements in motor scores when used on demand. However, an International Parkinson and Movement Disorder Society evidence-based review judged the randomized-trial data insufficient to establish sustained benefits in disability or quality of life over 12-week treatment periods for intermittent formulations, including sublingual film.

Continuous subcutaneous infusion through a wearable device is used for motor fluctuations inadequately controlled with oral or transdermal therapies and has been shown to reduce daily "off" time.

Other non-invasive routes have been investigated as alternatives to parenteral administration at various preclinical and clinical stages, including oral, nasal, pulmonary, transdermal, rectal, and buccal administration, as well as transdermal iontophoresis.

== Contraindications ==
Apomorphine is contraindicated when used concomitantly with serotonin 5-HT_{3} receptor antagonists, including ondansetron, granisetron, and palonosetron, as this combination has been associated with profound hypotension and loss of consciousness. It is also contraindicated with allergies to the drug or its excipients, including sulfites. Intravenous administration of apomorphine is associated with blood clots and pulmonary embolism due to crystallization in the vein and is not recommended.

== Side effects ==
Common side effects of apomorphine include nausea and vomiting, particularly when starting treatment, and injection site reactions, including bruising, subcutaneous nodules, and rarely necrosis or abscesses. Other common side effects include somnolence, dizziness, and falls. Clinical reviews note that while nausea is frequently reported early during apomorphine therapy, tolerability may improve with a lower starting dose and continued use. Less common side effects include dyskinesia, orthostatic hypotension, hallucinations or psychotic-like behaviour, syncope, hemolytic anaemia, impulse control disorders, dose-dependent QT interval prolongation, peripheral edema, and priapism. Adverse effects are more common with continuous subcutaneous apomorphine infusion than intermittent treatment.

== Pharmacology ==
=== Mechanism of action ===
Apomorphine's R-enantiomer is an agonist of both D_{1} and D_{2} dopamine receptors, with higher activity at D_{2}. The members of the D_{2} subfamily, consisting of D_{2}, D_{3}, and D_{4} receptors, are inhibitory G protein–coupled receptors. The D_{4} receptor in particular is an important target in the signalling pathway, and is connected to several neurological disorders. Shortage or excess of dopamine can prevent proper function and signalling of these receptors leading to disease states.

Apomorphine improves motor function by activating dopamine receptors in the nigrostriatal pathway, the limbic system, the hypothalamus, and the pituitary gland. It also increases blood flow to the supplementary motor area and to the dorsolateral prefrontal cortex (stimulation of which has been found to reduce the tardive dyskinesia effects of L-DOPA). Parkinson's has also been found to have excess iron at the sites of neurodegeneration; both the (R)- and (S)-enantiomers of apomorphine are potent iron chelators and radical scavengers.

Apomorphine also decreases the breakdown of dopamine in the brain (though it inhibits its synthesis as well). It is an upregulator of certain neural growth factors, in particular NGF but not BDNF, epigenetic downregulation of which has been associated with addictive behaviour in rats.

Apomorphine causes vomiting by acting on dopamine receptors in the chemoreceptor trigger zone of the medulla; this activates the nearby vomiting centre.

Apomorphine possesses affinity for the following receptors (note that a higher K_{i} indicates a lower affinity):

Dopamine
Receptor	K_{i} (nM)	Action
D_{1}	484	(partial) agonist^{a}
D_{2}	52	partial agonist (IA = 79% at D_{2S}; 53% at D_{2L})
D_{3}	26	partial agonist (IA = 82%)
D_{4}	4.37	partial agonist (IA = 45%)
D_{5}	188.9	(partial) agonist^{a}
^{a} Though its efficacies at D_{1} and D_{5} are unclear, it is known to act as an agonist at these sites.

Serotonin
Receptor	K_{i} (nM)	Action
5-HT_{1A}	2,523	partial agonist
5-HT_{1B}	2,951	no action
5-HT_{1D}	1,230	no action
5-HT_{2A}	120	antagonist
5-HT_{2B}	132	antagonist
5-HT_{2C}	102	antagonist

Norepinephrine/Epinephrine
Receptor	K_{i} (nM)	Action
α_{1A}-adrenergic	1,995	antagonist
α_{1B}-adrenergic	676	antagonist
α_{1D}-adrenergic	64.6	antagonist
α_{2A}-adrenergic	141	antagonist
α_{2B}-adrenergic	66.1	antagonist
α_{2C}-adrenergic	36.3	antagonist

It has a K_{i} of over 10,000 nM (and thus negligible affinity) for β-adrenergic, H_{1}, and mACh.

Toxicity depends on the route of administration; the LD_{50}s in mice were 300 mg/kg for the oral route, 160 mg/kg for intraperitoneal, and 56 mg/kg intravenous.

=== Pharmacokinetics ===
While apomorphine has lower bioavailability when taken orally, due to not being absorbed well in the GI tract and undergoing heavy first-pass metabolism, it has a bioavailability of 100% when given subcutaneously. It reaches peak plasma concentration in 10–60 minutes. Ten to twenty minutes after that, it reaches its peak concentration in the cerebrospinal fluid. Its lipophilic structure allows it to cross the blood–brain barrier.

Apomorphine has a high clearance rate (3–5 L/kg/hr) and is mainly metabolized and excreted by the liver. It is likely that while the cytochrome P450 system plays a minor role, most of apomorphine's metabolism happens via auto-oxidation, O-glucuronidation, O-methylation, N-demethylation, and sulfation. Only 3–4% of the apomorphine is excreted unchanged and into the urine. The half-life is 30–60 minutes, and the effects of the injection last for up to 90 minutes.

== Chemistry ==
=== Properties ===
Apomorphine has a catechol structure similar to that of dopamine.

=== Synthesis ===
Several techniques exist for the creation of apomorphine from morphine. In the past, morphine had been combined with hydrochloric acid at high temperatures (around 150 °C) to achieve a low yield of apomorphine, ranging anywhere from 0.6% to 46%.

More recent techniques create the apomorphine in a similar fashion, by heating it in the presence of any acid that will promote the essential dehydration rearrangement of morphine-type alkaloids, such as phosphoric acid. The method then deviates by including a water scavenger, which is essential to remove the water produced by the reaction that can react with the product and lead to decreased yield. The scavenger can be any reagent that will irreversibly react with water such as phthalic anhydride or titanium chloride. The temperature required for the reaction varies based upon choice of acid and water scavenger. The yield of this reaction is much higher: at least 55%.

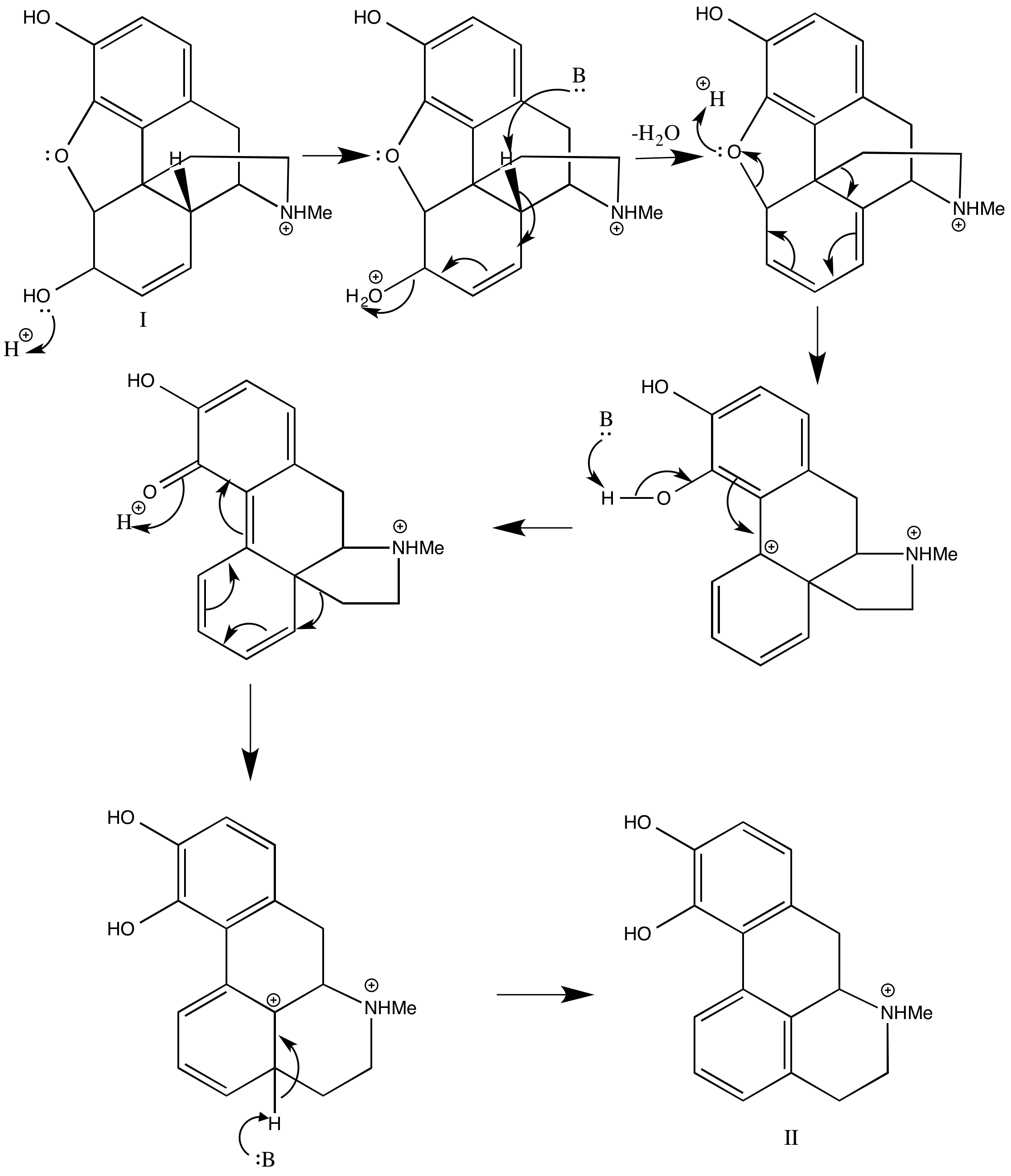
Conversion of morphine (I) to apomorphine (II) in the presence of acid following the example of the morphine skeleton dehydration rearrangement, outlined by Bentley

=== Related compounds ===
MDO-NPA, the methylenedioxy analog of apomorphine, has greater bioavailability and a longer duration of action.

== History ==
The pharmacological effects of the naturally occurring analog aporphine in the blue lotus (Nymphaea caerulea) were known to the ancient Egyptians and Mayans, with the plant featuring in tomb frescoes and associated with entheogenic rites.

Apomorphine was first chemically synthesized by Adolf Edvard Arppe in 1845 from morphine and sulfuric acid. Augustus Matthiessen and Charles Romley Alder Wright synthesized apomorphine from morphine and hydrochloric acid in 1869.

The drug was the subject of investigations by Samuel Gee, Erich Harnack, and Vincent Siebert in the 1860s and 1870s. Gee found a range of physiological effects in various animals, including stereotypies, excitement, vomiting, and epileptic convulsions; his findings were later confirmed by Harnack and Siebert. Harnack hypothesized it may have had effects less pronounced than emesis, and animal testing showed effects including on motor control and other functions, concluding that the drug affected multiple areas of the brain. Further animal experiments that included removing the medulla oblongata and otherwise targeting specific areas of the brain with the drug to produce particular effects allowed researchers to narrow the areas which the drug affected. Anton Marie Ernst later determined in a 1967 study that apomorphine affected dopaminergic receptors in the brain.

Apomorphine was heavily researched by the time of Ernst's study and had been used as an emetic in veterinary applications. In humans, the drug was used to treat a variety of maladies, including to induce vomiting in cases of poisoning, to relieve bronchitis and other respiratory illnesses, as an aversive conditioner in substance abuse treatment, to quell mania or anxiety, to treat erectile dysfunction, and to treat various movement disorders, among others. There are conflicting studies about the drug's efficacy in treating addiction.

Apomorphine was first suggested as a treatment for Parkinson's disease in 1884 by Edmond Weill, but it received limited interest from the scientific community until the late 1980s, when it was found to be a valuable therapy to be used alongside levodopa and related drugs.

Apomorphine has been researched as a possible treatment for erectile dysfunction and female hypoactive sexual desire disorder, though its efficacy has been limited.

== Veterinary use ==
Apomorphine is used to inducing vomiting in dogs after ingestion of various toxins or foreign bodies. It can be given subcutaneously, intramuscularly, intravenously, or, when a tablet is crushed, in the conjunctiva of the eye. The oral route is ineffective, as apomorphine cannot cross the blood–brain barrier fast enough, and blood levels don't reach a high enough concentration to stimulate the chemoreceptor trigger zone. It can remove around 40–60% of the contents in the stomach.

One of the reasons apomorphine is a preferred drug is its reversibility: in cases of prolonged vomiting, the apomorphine can be reversed with dopamine antagonists like the phenothiazines (for example, acepromazine). Giving apomorphine after giving acepromazine, however, will no longer stimulate vomiting, because apomorphine's target receptors are already occupied.

Apomorphine does not work in cats, who have too few dopamine receptors.

== See also ==
- List of investigational sexual dysfunction drugs
