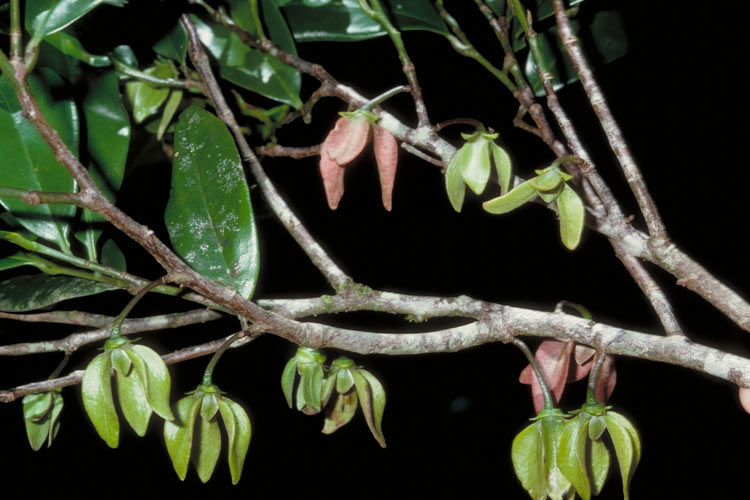
- Flowers

Conservation status
- Least Concern (IUCN 3.1)

Scientific classification
- Kingdom: Plantae
- Clade: Embryophytes
- Clade: Tracheophytes
- Clade: Spermatophytes
- Clade: Angiosperms
- Clade: Magnoliids
- Order: Magnoliales
- Family: Annonaceae
- Genus: Goniothalamus
- Species: G. australis

Binomial name
- Goniothalamus australis Jessup

= Goniothalamus australis =

China pine

Species of flowering plant

Goniothalamus australis, commonly known as China pine, is a species of plants in the custard apple family Annonaceae found only in the Wet Tropics bioregion of Queensland, Australia. It is a tree normally reaching about 20 m (66 ft) and 15 cm (5.9 in) diameter, but may reach 30 m (98 ft) on occasions. The leaves may reach up to 12 cm (4.7 in) long and 5 cm (2.0 in) wide, with 9–12 pairs of lateral veins on either side of the midrib. Flowers are solitary or (rarely) paired, with 3 sepals and 6 petals in two whorls of 3. The inner petals are much smaller than the outer ones and they are joined laterally, forming a cap over the reproductive organs. Stamens number about 80, ovaries number about 10 with up to 8 ovules each. Fruit are up to 6 cm (2.4 in) long by 2.5 cm (0.98 in) wide and contain up to 6 seeds. The species was first described by Laurence W. Jessup in 1986. It grows in upland rainforest at elevations from 600 to 1,200 m (2,000 to 3,900 ft), on the Atherton Tableland and northward to about Cooktown.

== Conservation ==
This species has been assessed to be of least concern by the International Union for Conservation of Nature (IUCN) and by the Queensland Government under its Nature Conservation Act.
