= Oliveroline =

Names
- IUPAC name (7aS,8S)-7-methyl-6,7,7a,8-tetrahydro-5H-[1,3]dioxolo[4',5':4,5]benzo[1,2,3-de]benzo[g]quinolin-8-ol

Identifiers
CAS Number	62504-55-6
3D model (JSmol)	Interactive image
ChemSpider	10379542
PubChem CID	3085243
UNII	2Y8ZBF5RC5
CompTox Dashboard (EPA)	DTXSID90978103
- InChI: InChI=1S/C18H17NO3/c1-19-7-6-10-8-13-18(22-9-21-13)15-11-4-2-3-5-12(11)17(20)16(19)14(10)15/h2-5,8,16-17,20H,6-7,9H2,1H3/t16-,17-/m0/s1 Key: NVMGTUCOAQKLLO-IRXDYDNUSA-N; InChI=1/C18H17NO3/c1-19-7-6-10-8-13-18(22-9-21-13)15-11-4-2-3-5-12(11)17(20)16(19)14(10)15/h2-5,8,16-17,20H,6-7,9H2,1H3/t16-,17-/m0/s1 Key: NVMGTUCOAQKLLO-IRXDYDNUBU
- SMILES: CN1CCc2cc3c(c-4c2[C@H]1[C@H](c5c4cccc5)O)OCO3

Properties
Chemical formula	C_{18}H_{17}NO_{3}
Molar mass	295.338 g·mol^{−1}
- Except where otherwise noted, data are given for materials in their standard state (at 25 °C [77 °F], 100 kPa). Infobox references

Oliveroline is an anti-cholinergic aporphine alkaloid.
