= Alpha-1D adrenergic receptor =

Protein-coding gene in humans

ADRA1D

Identifiers
- Aliases: ADRA1D, ADRA1, ADRA1A, ADRA1R, ALPHA1, DAR, dJ779E11.2, adrenoceptor alpha 1D
- External IDs: OMIM: 104219; MGI: 106673; GeneCards: ADRA1D

Gene location (Human)
Chr.	Chromosome 20 (human)
Band	20p13	Start	4,220,630 bp
Band	20p13	End	4,249,287 bp

Gene location (Mouse)
Chr.	Chromosome 2 (mouse)
Band	2 F1|2 63.5 cM	Start	131,387,770 bp
Band	2 F1|2 63.5 cM	End	131,404,203 bp
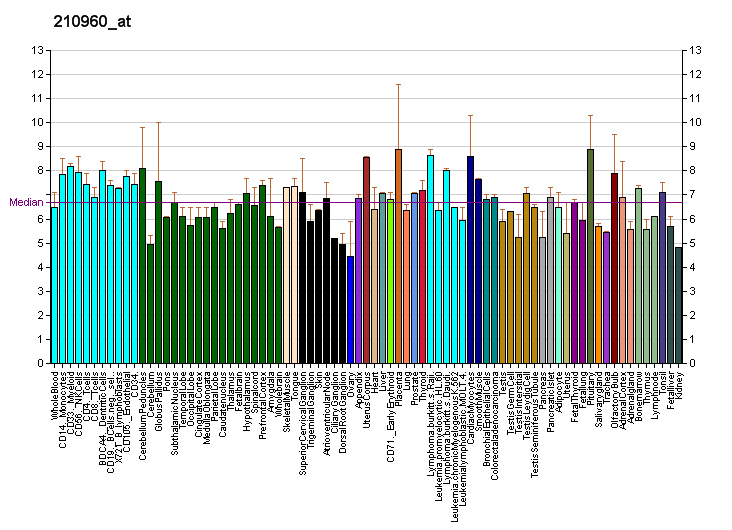

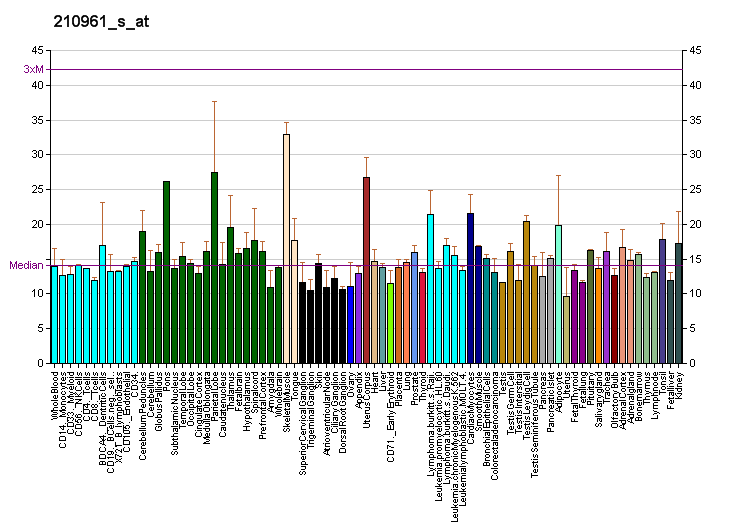
RNA expression pattern
Bgee	Human / Mouse (ortholog); Top expressed in: testicle; Descending thoracic aorta; ascending aorta; canal of the cervix; ectocervix; stromal cell of endometrium; prefrontal cortex; lateral nuclear group of thalamus; tibial nerve; gastric mucosa / Top expressed in: hippocampus proper; primary visual cortex; dentate gyrus of hippocampal formation granule cell; olfactory bulb; superior frontal gyrus; white adipose tissue; adrenal gland; embryo; cerebellar cortex; embryo; More reference expression data
BioGPS	More reference expression data
Gene ontology
Molecular function	G protein-coupled receptor activity; signal transducer activity; adrenergic receptor activity; protein binding; alpha1-adrenergic receptor activity
Cellular component	integral component of membrane; membrane; plasma membrane; integral component of plasma membrane; intracellular anatomical structure
Biological process	G protein-coupled receptor signaling pathway; norepinephrine-epinephrine vasoconstriction involved in regulation of systemic arterial blood pressure; adenylate cyclase-modulating G protein-coupled receptor signaling pathway; positive regulation of cytosolic calcium ion concentration; cell-cell signaling; DNA metabolic process; multicellular organism development; adenylate cyclase-activating adrenergic receptor signaling pathway; phospholipase C-activating G protein-coupled receptor signaling pathway; positive regulation of vasoconstriction; positive regulation of cell population proliferation; cell population proliferation; positive regulation of smooth muscle contraction; signal transduction; neuron-glial cell signaling; adrenergic receptor signaling pathway
Sources:Amigo / QuickGO
Orthologs
Databases	NCBI: entry; OMA: entry
Species	Human	Mouse
Entrez	146	11550
Ensembl	ENSG00000171873	ENSMUSG00000027335
UniProt	P25100	P97714
RefSeq (mRNA)	NM_000678	NM_013460
RefSeq (protein)	NP_000669; NP_000669.1	NP_038488
Location (UCSC)	Chr 20: 4.22 – 4.25 Mb	Chr 2: 131.39 – 131.4 Mb
PubMed search
- Wikidata
View/Edit Human	View/Edit Mouse

The alpha-1D adrenergic receptor (α_{1D} adrenoreceptor), also known as ADRA1D, is an alpha-1 adrenergic receptor, and also denotes the human gene encoding it.

== Receptor ==
There are 3 alpha-1 adrenergic receptor subtypes: alpha-1A, -1B and -1D, all of which signal through the Gq/11 family of G-proteins and different subtypes show different patterns of activation. They activate mitogenic responses and regulate growth and proliferation of many cells.

== Gene ==
This gene encodes alpha-1D-adrenergic receptor. Similar to alpha-1B-adrenergic receptor gene, this gene comprises 2 exons and a single intron that interrupts the coding region.

== Ligands ==
Many α_{1} receptor ligands are non-selective for receptor subtypes.

Antagonists

- A-315456
- BMY 7378 (also α_{2C} antagonist)
- Domesticine
- Cyclazosin (slight α_{1C} selectivity)
- Tamsulosin (roughly equal affinity for α_{1A})

== See also ==
- Adrenergic receptor
