= Titanium chloride =

Titanium chloride may refer to:

- Titanium tetrachloride (titanium(IV) chloride), TiCl_{4}
- Titanium trichloride (titanium(III) chloride), TiCl_{3}
- Titanium dichloride (titanium(II) chloride), TiCl_{2}
