= Xylopine =

Names
- IUPAC name 9-Methoxy-2′H-12-nor-[1,3]dioxolo[4′,5′:1,2]-6aβ-aporphine
- Systematic IUPAC name (7aR)-10-Methoxy-6,7,7a,8-tetrahydro-2H,5H-benzo[g][1,3]benzodioxolo[6,5,4-de]quinoline

Identifiers
CAS Number	517-71-5
3D model (JSmol)	Interactive image
ChEBI	CHEBI:10083
ChemSpider	141042
KEGG	C09670
PubChem CID	160503
UNII	NNZ7TH999H
CompTox Dashboard (EPA)	DTXSID70965975
- InChI: InChI=1S/C18H17NO3/c1-20-12-2-3-13-11(6-12)7-14-16-10(4-5-19-14)8-15-18(17(13)16)22-9-21-15/h2-3,6,8,14,19H,4-5,7,9H2,1H3/t14-/m1/s1 Key: RFWCCZDSXIZJMF-CQSZACIVSA-N
- SMILES: COC1=CC2=C(C=C1)C3=C4[C@@H](C2)NCCC4=CC5=C3OCO5

Properties
Chemical formula	C_{18}H_{17}NO_{3}
Molar mass	295.338 g·mol^{−1}
- Except where otherwise noted, data are given for materials in their standard state (at 25 °C [77 °F], 100 kPa). Infobox references

Xylopine is an antimicrobial benzylisoquinoline alkaloid.

Xylopine is a noraporphine alkaloid that occurs in Xylopia discreta
