= Aporphine =

Chemical compound

Identifiers
- IUPAC name: 6-methyl-5,6,6a,7-tetrahydro-4H-dibenzo[de,g]quinoline
- CAS Number: 478-57-9
- PubChem CID: 114911
- ChemSpider: 102860
- UNII: 13NS2KTD6H
- ChEBI: CHEBI:35643
- CompTox Dashboard (EPA): DTXSID80895017

Chemical and physical data
- Formula: C_{17}H_{17}N
- Molar mass: 235.330 g·mol^{−1}
- 3D model (JSmol): Interactive image
- SMILES: c12c(cccc1)CC4c3c(cccc23)CCN4C
- InChI: InChI=1S/C17H17N/c1-18-10-9-12-6-4-8-15-14-7-3-2-5-13(14)11-16(18)17(12)15/h2-8,16H,9-11H2,1H3; Key:BZKUYNBAFQJRDM-UHFFFAOYSA-N

Aporphine is an alkaloid with the chemical formula C_{17}H_{17}N. It is the core chemical substructure of the aporphine alkaloids, a subclass of quinoline alkaloids. It can exist in either of two enantiomeric forms, (R)-aporphine and (S)-aporphine.

== Derivatives ==
Many different derivatives of aporphine have been isolated from plants. For example, many water lilies (Nymphaea species) produce aporphine alkaloids such as nuciferine, nymphaeine, nymphaline, nupharine, α- and β-nupharidine.

In vitro, tests of some aporphine derivatives isolated from Cassytha filiformis, namely actinodaphnine, cassythine, and dicentrine, showed antiparasitic activity against Trypanosoma brucei. Investigation of possible mechanisms revealed that the compounds bind to DNA and act as intercalating agents, in addition to inhibiting topoisomerase activity.

Aporphine natural products occur with either the (R)- or (S)-isomeric forms, or they can be achiral. Furthermore, morphine-based natural products can be heated in acid to give aporphine degradation products; one example is the FDA-approved Parkinson's drug apomorphine, which was first discovered by the Finnish chemist Adolf Edvard Arppe in 1845.

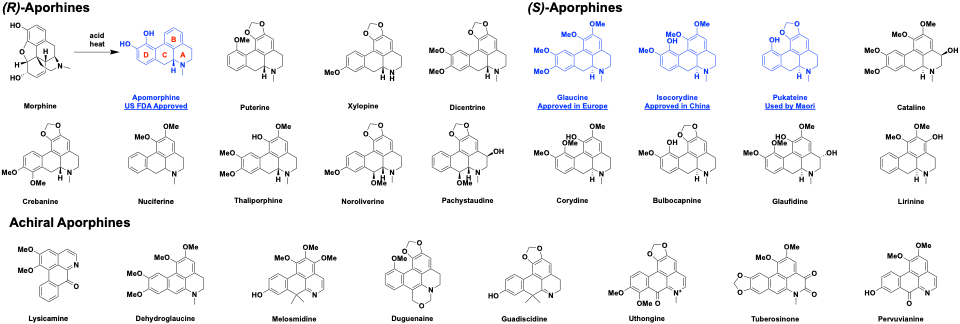
Aporphines can occur as either (R)- or (S)-isomers, or as achiral compounds, and while many of these are toxic, some have been used for their medicinal value and have been approved by the FDA and world markets.

=== Apomorphine ===
Apomorphine is a derivative of aporphine. The compound is historically obtained by heating morphine with hydrochloric acid. Contrary to its name, apomorphine does not contain morphine or its skeleton, nor does it bind to opioid receptors. The apo- prefix indicates that it is a morphine derivative.

Historically, apomorphine has seen a variety of clinical uses including as a treatment for anxiety and cravings in alcoholics, as an emetic, and more recently in treating erectile dysfunction. It was also used as a private treatment for heroin addiction. Still, there is no clinical evidence that apomorphine is an effective and safe treatment for opiate addiction.

Currently, apomorphine is used in the treatment of Parkinson's disease. It is a potent emetic, typically administered with an antiemetic such as domperidone. Apomorphine is also utilized in veterinary medicine to induce therapeutic emesis in canines that have recently ingested toxic or foreign substances.

== Effects ==
Aporphine is a dopamine-active chemical scaffold whose enantiomers can either agonize or antagonize D_{1} and D_{2} receptors, depending on their structure. In rodents, aporphine administration has been demonstrated to activate gene expression, specifically in the nuclei of the hypothalamus, resulting in stereotypical behavior of erection and yawning. In humans, aporphine produces nonsexual erections that are enhanced by erotic stimulation without changes in libido, but significant side effects can occur. A sublingual formulation of aporphine 2–4 mg with a rapid onset of action has been developed, proven to be efficacious in erectile dysfunction patients with controlled diabetes, hypertension, benign prostatic hyperplasia or coronary artery disease.

== Synthesis ==
Aporphine and its derivatives can be obtained through various synthetic methods. Several natural products including semisynthetic analogs belonging to the aporphine class have been synthesized. These include apomorphine by Neumeyer and Raminelli, pukateine by Happel, isocorydine by Di, nuciferine and oliveroline by Cuny, glaucine by Meyers, dicentrine by Cava, and lysicamine by Raminelli.

== Toxicity ==
Most aporphine alkaloids are toxic and typically exhibit antagonistic effects to dopamine. Many of them have anticonvulsant activity or induce convulsions in animals due to cytotoxic activity.

Some aporphine alkaloids (such as crebanine) have been found to present arrhythmic activity and higher toxicity. In one study, a couple of target derivatives were evaluated for their anti-arrhythmic potential in the mouse model of ventricular fibrillation. Here, preliminary structure-activity/toxicity relationship analyses were carried out. Of these target derivatives, a certain bromo-substituted product of crebanine displayed significant anti-arrhythmic activity and a lower toxicity. In a significant number of rats, this product caused reduction in the incidence of VF, increase in the resumption of sinus rhythm from arrhythmia, and increase in maintaining sinus rhythm. The results from this limited study indicate that this specific aporphine alkaloid could be considered as a promising candidate in the treatment of arrhythmia.

== Pharmacology ==
=== Pharmacodynamics ===
According to the U.S. Patent & Trademark Office, aporphine derivatives can treat oxidative stress-induced diseases. Specifically, it inhibits lipid peroxidase and performs free radical-scavenging activities, thereby exhibiting a protective effect on endothelial cells. This reduces oxidative stress which may induce diseases such as cardiovascular disease, Alzheimer's disease, kidney disease, diabetes, cancer etc.

Aporphine alkaloids present in Litsea glutinosa, a tropical plant with antioxidant and anti-parasitic properties, are claimed to contribute to anti-cancer activity. Research has illustrated the antiproliferative and cytotoxic effects of aporphine-containing extracts of Litsea glutinosa.

(R)-Aporphine is a dopamine receptor D_{1} antagonist with a K_{i} of 717 nM and a dopamine receptor D_{2} antagonist with a K_{i} of 527nM. Aporphine and its related alkaloids bulbocapnine, boldine, glaucine, and corytuberine are antipsychotic, exert naloxone-reversible antinociceptive activity and, except for corytuberine, are anticonvulsant. Some derivatives of aporphine such as (S)-(+)-N-propylnorapomorphine have potential as low side effect profile antipsychotics. (S)-(+)-N-Propylnorapomorphine is highly selective for meso-limbic dopaminergic tracts and function as efficacious partial agonists, with no elevation in prolactin.

Aporphines, including nuciferine, dicentrine, isolaureline, and crebanine, among others, are antagonists or very weak partial agonists of the serotonin 5-HT_{2A} and/or 5-HT_{2C} receptors. However, an exception with higher-efficacy serotonin 5-HT_{2A} receptor agonism is glaucine.

=== Pharmacokinetics ===
Aporphine is hydroxylated in the body to form apomorphine.

== Psychoactive effects ==
The Nymphaea species, particularly Nymphaea caerulea, contains aporphine alkaloids and is utilized in various contexts. Extracts of this plant when ingested or smoked in high doses are reported to produce euphoria and hallucinations. Commonly known as the blue lotus, Nymphaea caerulea is available in several forms, including dried plant material, teas, and extracts for electronic cigarettes. The psychoactive effects of the flower are attributed to two aporphine alkaloids: apomorphine and nuciferine. These compounds have mixed effects on serotonin and dopamine receptors.

In addition to Nymphaea caerulea, the Sacred Lotus Nelumbo nucifera, a member of the Nelumbo genus, contains aporphine alkaloids such as nuciferine.

== Effects on animals ==
There are no studies on aporphine in animals. However, studies on subcutaneous apomorphine injection, the bioactive form of aporphine, have been carried out. In a 5-day study, mice were administered up to 10 mg/kg apomorphine subcutaneously daily. No adverse effects were observed other than a slight increase in dopamine levels. Notably, apomorphine is used in veterinary clinics as an emetic due to severe off-target effects that lead to vomiting.

In another study, investigations of whether systemic injection of apomorphine and its oxidation derivative 8-oxo-apomorphine-semiquinone (8-OASQ) could induce DNA damage in mice brain, using the single-cell gel assay. 8-OASQ induced DNA damage in the brains at 1 and 3 h, but not at 24 h after treatment whereas apomorphine induced a slight increase in brain DNA damage frequency at 3 h after treatment, suggesting that both drugs display genotoxic activity in brain tissue.

== Gallery ==
3D space-filling model of (R)-aporphine rotating about the y-axis

3D space-filling model of (S)-aporphine rotating about the y-axis

== See also ==
- Anonaine
- Liriodenine
- Magnoflorine
- Nantenine
- Nuciferine
- Noraporphine
