= 11-Chloroasimilobine =

Clinical data
- Other names: 11-Chloroasimilobine; 1-Methoxy-2-hydroxy-11-chloronoraporphine; Compound 16k; Compound S11; 1-Methoxy-2-hydroxy-11-chloro-aporphine
- Drug class: Serotonin 5-HT_{2C} receptor agonist
- ATC code: None

Identifiers
- IUPAC name: 11-chloro-1-methoxy-5,6,6a,7-tetrahydro-4H-dibenzo[de,g]quinolin-2-ol
- PubChem CID: 175794272

Chemical and physical data
- Formula: C_{17}H_{16}ClNO_{2}
- Molar mass: 301.77 g·mol^{−1}
- 3D model (JSmol): Interactive image
- SMILES: COC1=C(C=C2CCNC3C2=C1C4=C(C3)C=CC=C4Cl)O
- InChI: InChI=1S/C17H16ClNO2/c1-21-17-13(20)8-10-5-6-19-12-7-9-3-2-4-11(18)14(9)16(17)15(10)12/h2-4,8,12,19-20H,5-7H2,1H3; Key:IPWPEVUQAYSYTJ-UHFFFAOYSA-N

11-Chloroasimilobine, also known as 1-methoxy-2-hydroxy-11-chloronoraporphine, is a serotonin 5-HT_{2C} receptor agonist of the noraporphine family. It is a synthetic compound and is the racemic 11-chloro derivative of the aporphine alkaloid asimilobine.

The drug acts as a highly selective G_{q}-preferring biased agonist of the serotonin 5-HT_{2C} receptor. Its EC_{50} (E_{max}) values were 36 nM (102%) for G_{q} signaling and 437 nM (62%) for β-arrestin2 recruitment. 11-Chloroasimilobine was inactive as an agonist of the serotonin 5-HT_{2A} and 5-HT_{2B} receptors at concentrations of up to 30,000 nM. It was also selective for the serotonin 5-HT_{2C} receptor over a panel of other targets. The drug has been found to reverse the hyperlocomotion induced by dizocilpine (MK801) and phencyclidine (PCP) in rodents. The pharmacokinetics of 11-chloroasimilobine have been studied.

The chemical synthesis of the compound has been described.

11-Chloroasimilobine was described in the scientific literature by Wangzhi Qin and colleagues in 2025. It had previously been patented in 2022.

== See also ==
- Serotonin 5-HT_{2C} receptor agonist
- Aporphine alkaloids
- MQ02-439
- Asimilobine
- Glaucine
- Nuciferine
