= Isoteolin =

Names
- IUPAC name 2,10-Dimethoxyaporphine-1,9-diol
- Systematic IUPAC name (6aS)-2,10-Dimethoxy-6-methyl-5,6,6a,7-tetrahydro-4H-dibenzo[de,g]quinoline-1,9-diol
- Other names (+)-Isoboldine

Identifiers
CAS Number	3019-51-0
3D model (JSmol)	Interactive image
ChEBI	CHEBI:5986
ChEMBL	ChEMBL462880
ChemSpider	117620
KEGG	C09541
PubChem CID	133323
UNII	M002E511AJ
CompTox Dashboard (EPA)	DTXSID301045612
- InChI: InChI=1S/C19H21NO4/c1-20-5-4-10-8-16(24-3)19(22)18-12-9-15(23-2)14(21)7-11(12)6-13(20)17(10)18/h7-9,13,21-22H,4-6H2,1-3H3/t13-/m0/s1 Key: LINHZVMHXABQLB-ZDUSSCGKSA-N
- SMILES: CN1CCC2=CC(=C(C3=C2[C@@H]1CC4=CC(=C(C=C43)OC)O)O)OC

Properties
Chemical formula	C_{19}H_{21}NO_{4}
Molar mass	327.380 g·mol^{−1}
- Except where otherwise noted, data are given for materials in their standard state (at 25 °C [77 °F], 100 kPa). Infobox references

Isoteolin is an antihypertensive and psychoactive chemical.
