= Aporphine alkaloids =

Alkaloid chemical compound

Chemical structure of aporphine which forms the core chemical structure of the aporphine alkaloids

Aporphine alkaloids are naturally occurring chemical compounds from the group of alkaloids. After the benzylisoquinoline alkaloids they are the second largest group of isoquinoline alkaloids.

At least 85 aporphine alkaloids have been isolated from plants of 15 families. The best known representative is apomorphine. The aporphine alkaloids are of interest mainly because of their similarity to morphine.

== Occurrence ==
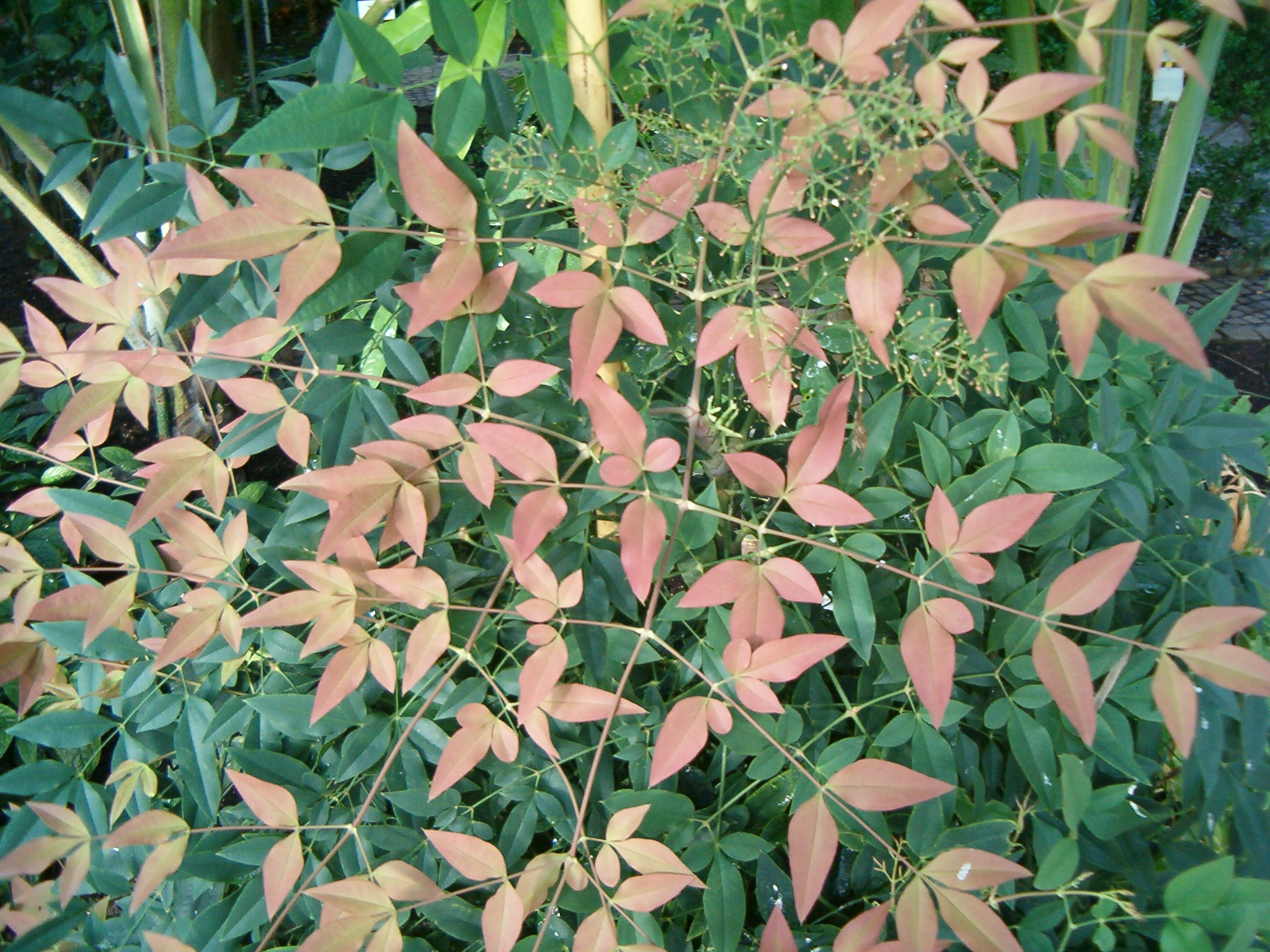
Nandina domestica

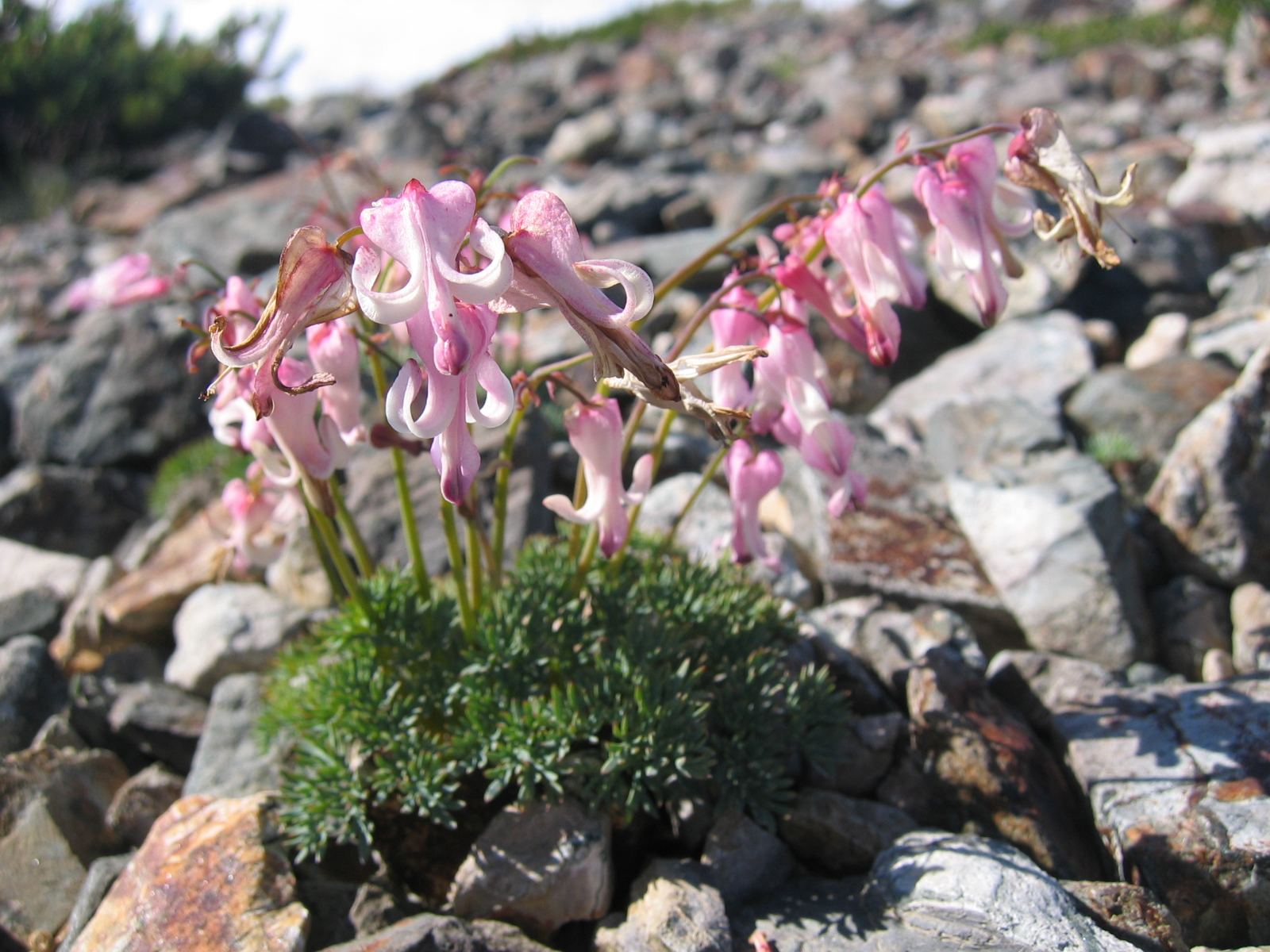
Dicentra peregrina

The aporphine alkaloids are most commonly found in plants. For example, isoboldine can be found in the plants in the genera Beilschmiedia, Nandina (Nandina domestica), Glaucium (horn poppy), and other plants. As the name suggests, glaucine was first found in the horn poppy and usually the name of the alkaloids is derived from the plants in which they were first found.

Corydin as a further representative of the aporphine alkaloids is found in Corydalis (larkspurs) Dicentra (heart flowers), and also in the horn poppy.

== Examples ==
Apoglaziovine

Apomorphine

Bulbocapnine

Corydine

Domesticine

Glaucine

Isoboldine

Isothebaine

Nuciferine

The aporphine alkaloids differ in their substituents and their position on the base structure. Furthermore, their stereochemistry is partly different; most often they are (R)-configured, but glaucine, bulbocapnine, and isothebaine, for example, are (S)-configured.

== Biosynthesis ==
The method by which the central aporphine ring structure is constructed in nature is exemplified by the biosynthesis of bulbocarpin. First, reticuline 1 is oxidized, resulting in a mesomery-stabilized diradical with the boundary structures 2a and 2b. Cyclization results in a fourth six-membered ring, corytuberin 3, which then dehydrates to bulbocapnin 4.

== Chemistry ==
Stereocenter is marked with a *.

The aporphine alkaloids are of particular interest because of their proximity to morphine and benzylisoquinoline alkaloids. For example, as the name suggests, morphine can be used to produce apomorphine. This can be done by adding an acid under the influence of heat.

The proaporphin alkaloids and the aporphin alkaloids share a framework isomerism.

The aporphine alkaloids usually have a stereocenter.

The (R)-configured glaucine can be synthesized from (S)-glaucine.

== Pharmacology ==
Aporphine alkaloids, including nuciferine, dicentrine, isolaureline, and crebanine, tend to be antagonists or very weak partial agonists of the serotonin 5-HT_{2A} and/or 5-HT_{2C} receptors. However, an exception with higher-efficacy serotonin 5-HT_{2A} receptor agonism is glaucine.

== Uses ==
Apomorphine lowers blood pressure and is also a powerful emetic. It has been used to treat symptoms of Parkinson's disease because of its stimulating effect on dopamine receptors.

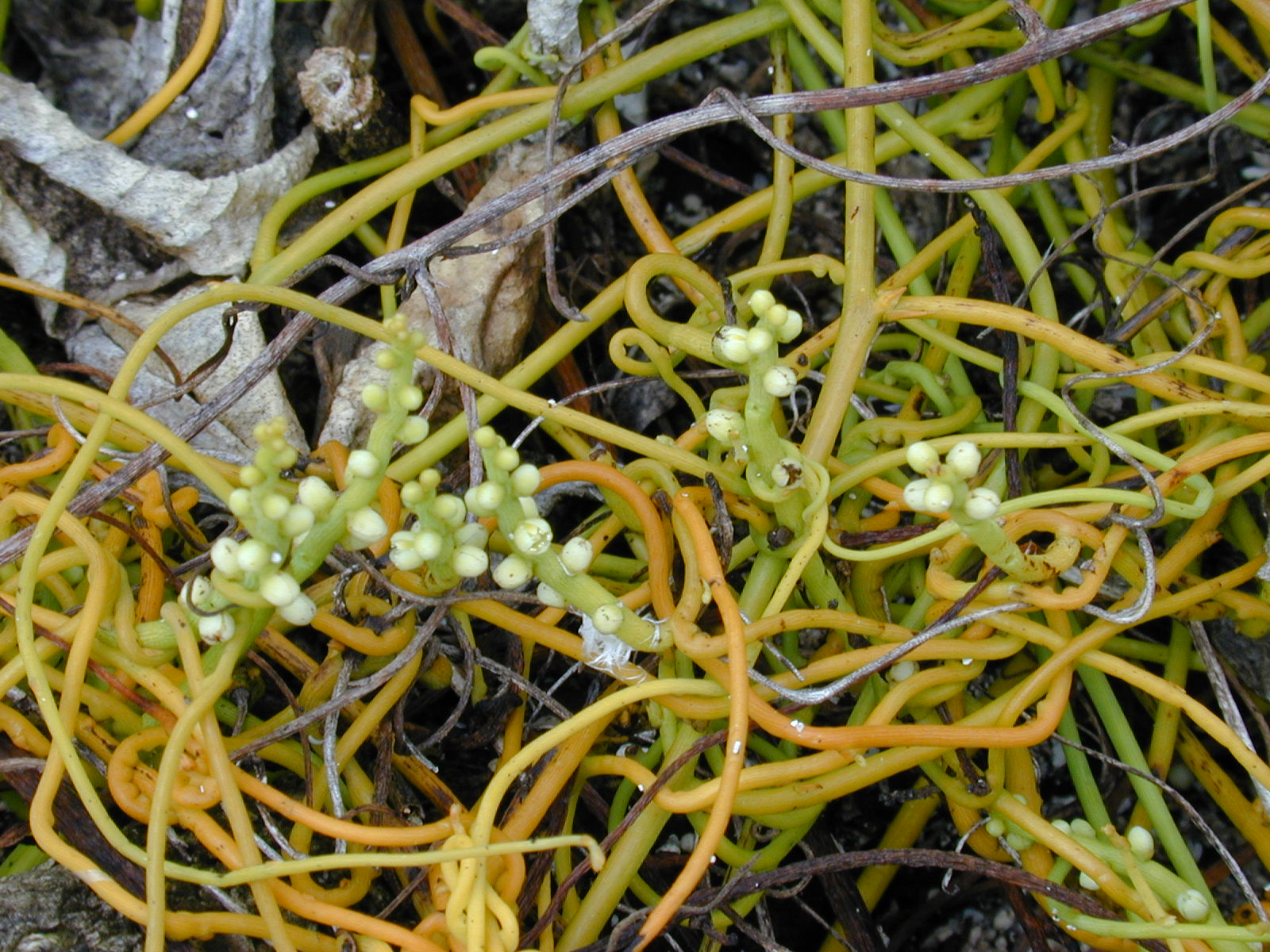
Cassytha filiformis

Cassytha filiformis, a plant used in African traditional medicine, contains many aporphine alkaloids and that the three main alkaloids actinodaphnin, cassythin, and dicentrin have an in vitro effect on cancer cells.
