= Dicentrine =

Names
- Preferred IUPAC name (7aS)-10,11-Dimethoxy-7-methyl-6,7,7a,8-tetrahydro-2H,5H-benzo[g][1,3]benzodioxolo[6,5,4-de]quinoline
- Other names (S)-(+)-Dicentrine

Identifiers
CAS Number	517-66-8
3D model (JSmol)	Interactive image
ChemSpider	91532
PubChem CID	101300
UNII	J2ZGT5M0N7
CompTox Dashboard (EPA)	DTXSID10199651
- InChI: InChI=1S/C20H21NO4/c1-21-5-4-11-7-17-20(25-10-24-17)19-13-9-16(23-3)15(22-2)8-12(13)6-14(21)18(11)19/h7-9,14H,4-6,10H2,1-3H3/t14-/m0/s1 Key: YJWBWQWUHVXPNC-AWEZNQCLSA-N
- SMILES: CN1CCc2cc3c(c-4c2[C@@H]1Cc5c4cc(c(c5)OC)OC)OCO3

Properties
Chemical formula	C_{20}H_{21}NO_{4}
Molar mass	339.391 g·mol^{−1}
- Except where otherwise noted, data are given for materials in their standard state (at 25 °C [77 °F], 100 kPa). Infobox references

Dicentrine is an aporphinic alkaloid found in several plant species, mainly from family Lauraceae, including Lindera megaphylla. At high doses, dicentrine shows antinociceptive activity in a mouse model of pain. It probably acts via a TRPA1-dependent mechanism.
