= Liriodenine =

Names
- IUPAC name 4,5,6,6a-Tetradehydro-12-nor-2′H-[1,3]dioxolo[4′,5′:1,2]aporphin-7-one
- Systematic IUPAC name 2H,8H-Benzo[g][1,3]benzodioxolo[6,5,4-de]quinolin-8-one

Identifiers
CAS Number	475-75-2
3D model (JSmol)	Interactive image
ChEBI	CHEBI:70649
ChemSpider	9738
KEGG	C09567
PubChem CID	10144
UNII	E134R7X4O9
CompTox Dashboard (EPA)	DTXSID40197165
- InChI: InChI=1S/C17H9NO3/c19-16-11-4-2-1-3-10(11)14-13-9(5-6-18-15(13)16)7-12-17(14)21-8-20-12/h1-7H,8H2 Key: MUMCCPUVOAUBAN-UHFFFAOYSA-N; InChI=1/C17H9NO3/c19-16-11-4-2-1-3-10(11)14-13-9(5-6-18-15(13)16)7-12-17(14)21-8-20-12/h1-7H,8H2 Key: MUMCCPUVOAUBAN-UHFFFAOYAX
- SMILES: C1OC2=C(O1)C3=C4C(=C2)C=CN=C4C(=O)C5=CC=CC=C53

Properties
Chemical formula	C_{17}H_{9}NO_{3}
Molar mass	275.263 g·mol^{−1}
- Except where otherwise noted, data are given for materials in their standard state (at 25 °C [77 °F], 100 kPa). Infobox references

Liriodenine is a bio-active isolate of the Chinese medicinal herb Zanthoxylum nitidum. It was isolated for the first time, at least with the name liriodenine, from the heartwood of Liriodendron tulipifera, the common yellow poplar of the south-eastern US. It is found in very many other plants, notably in Annona cherimolia and Annona muricata, widely cultivated for their edible fruit.
