= Histology =

Study of the microscopic anatomy of cells and tissues of plants and animals

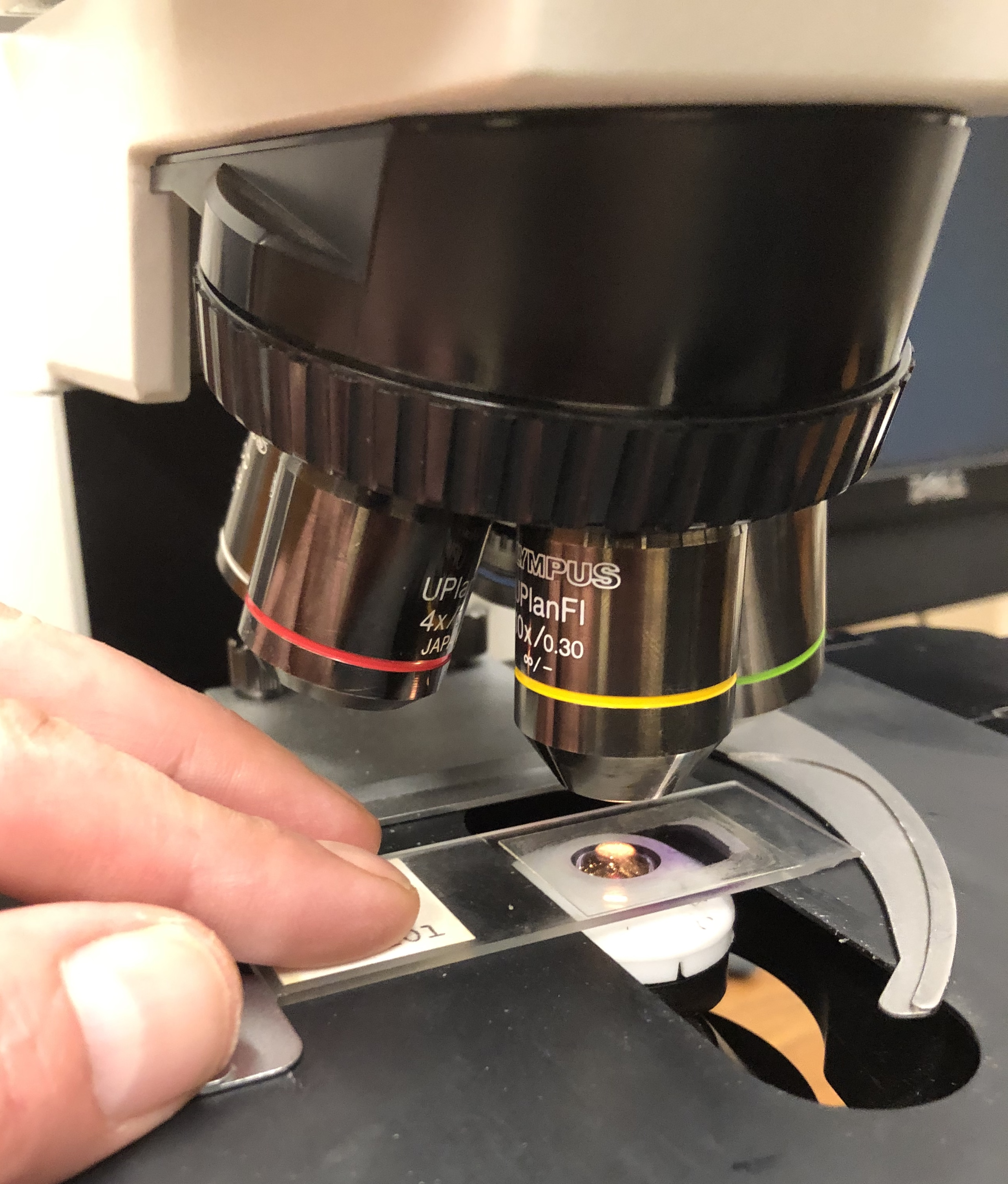
Histologic specimen being placed on the stage of an optical microscope

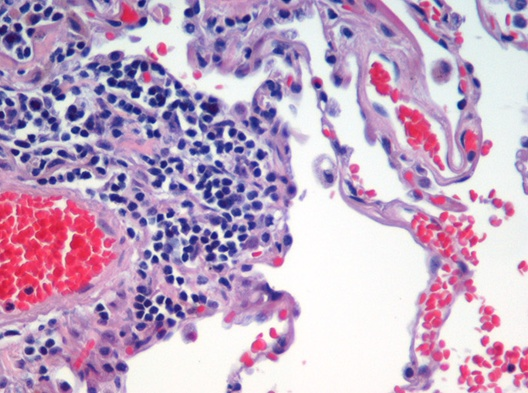
Human lung tissue stained with hematoxylin and eosin as seen under a microscope

Histology, (Note: The word histology (/hɪsˈtɒlədʒi/) is Neo-Latin, combining histo- + -logy to mean "study of tissue"; from the Greek words ἱστός (histós) "tissue", and -λογία (-logía) "study of".) also known as microscopic anatomy, microanatomy or histoanatomy, is the branch of biology that studies the microscopic anatomy of biological tissues. Histology is the microscopic counterpart to gross anatomy, which looks at larger structures visible without a microscope.

Historically, microscopic anatomy was divided into organology, the study of organs; histology, the study of tissues; and cytology, the study of cells; although modern usage places all of these topics under the field of histology. In medicine, histopathology is the branch of histology that includes the microscopic identification and study of diseased tissue. In the field of paleontology, the term paleohistology refers to the histology of fossil organisms.

== Biological tissues ==
=== Animal tissue classification ===
There are four basic types of animal tissues: muscle tissue, nervous tissue, connective tissue, and epithelial tissue. All animal tissues are considered to be subtypes of these four principal tissue types (for example, blood is classified as connective tissue, since the blood cells are suspended in an extracellular matrix, the plasma).

- Epithelium
  - Simple epithelium.
    - Simple squamous epithelium.
    - Simple cuboidal epithelium.
    - Simple columnar epithelium.
  - Pseudostratified columnar epithelium
  - Stratified epithelium
    - Stratified squamous epithelium
    - Stratified cuboidal epithelium
    - Stratified columnar epithelium
    - Transitional epithelium
  - Multicellular glands
- Muscle tissue
  - Smooth muscle
  - Skeletal muscle
  - Cardiac muscle
- Connective tissue
  - General connective tissue
    - Loose connective tissue
    - Dense connective tissue
  - Special connective tissue
    - Cartilage
    - Bone
    - Hemopoietic
    - Blood
    - Lymph
- Nervous tissue
  - Central nervous system
  - Peripheral nervous system
  - Special receptors

.

=== Plant tissue classification ===
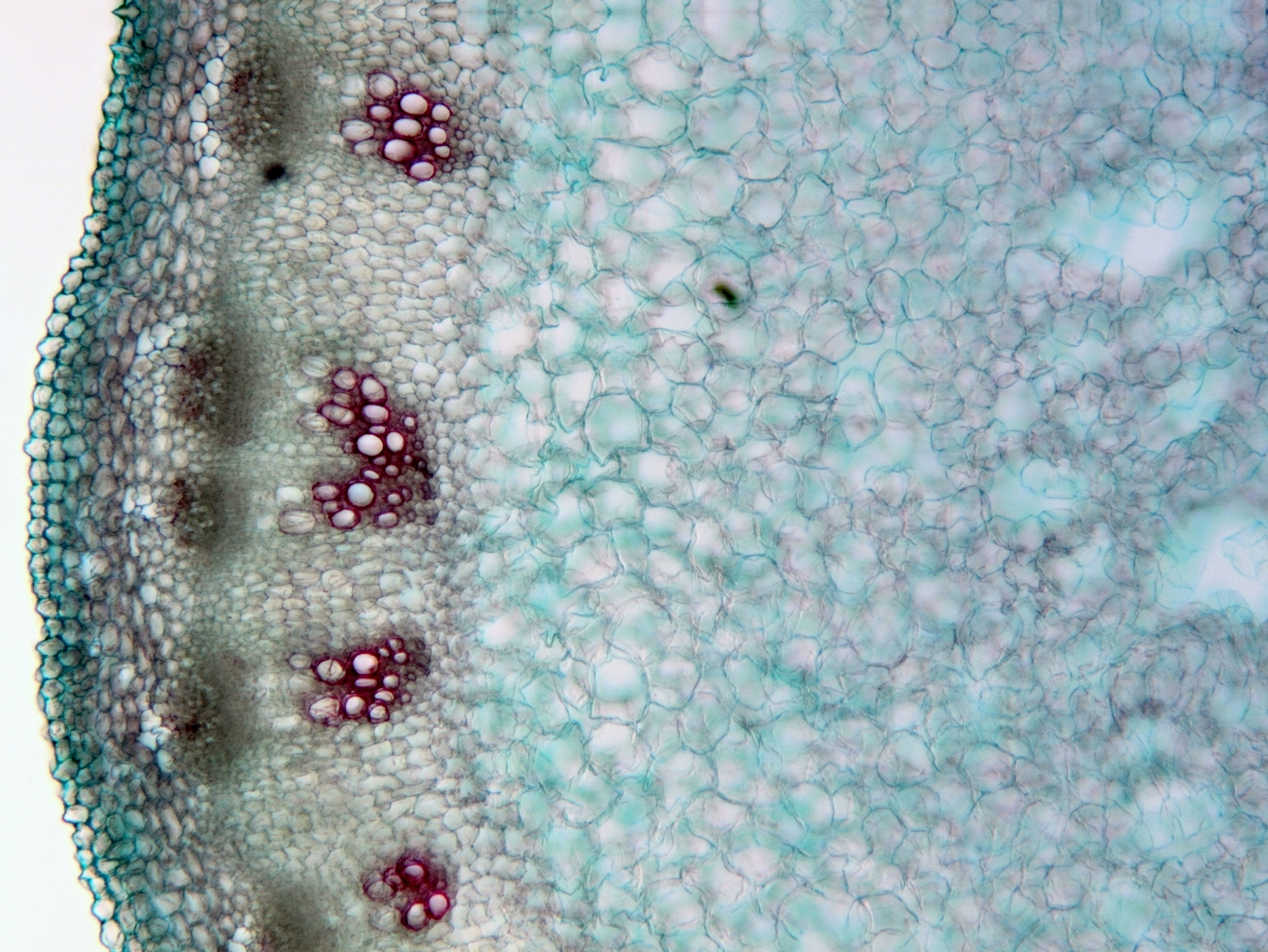
Histologic section of a plant stem (Alliaria petiolata)

For plants, the study of their tissues falls under the field of plant anatomy, with the following four main types:

- Dermal tissue
- Vascular tissue
- Ground tissue
- Meristematic tissue

== Medical histology ==
Histopathology is the branch of histology that includes the microscopic identification and study of diseased tissue. It is an important part of anatomical pathology and surgical pathology, as accurate diagnosis of cancer and other diseases often requires histopathological examination of tissue samples. Trained physicians, frequently licensed pathologists, perform histopathological examination and provide diagnostic information based on their observations.

=== Occupations ===
The field of histology that includes the preparation of tissues for microscopic examination is known as histotechnology. Job titles for the trained personnel who prepare histological specimens for examination are numerous and include histotechnicians, histotechnologists, histology technicians and technologists, medical laboratory technicians, and biomedical scientists.

== Sample preparation ==
Most histological samples need preparation before microscopic observation; these methods depend on the specimen and method of observation.

=== Fixation ===
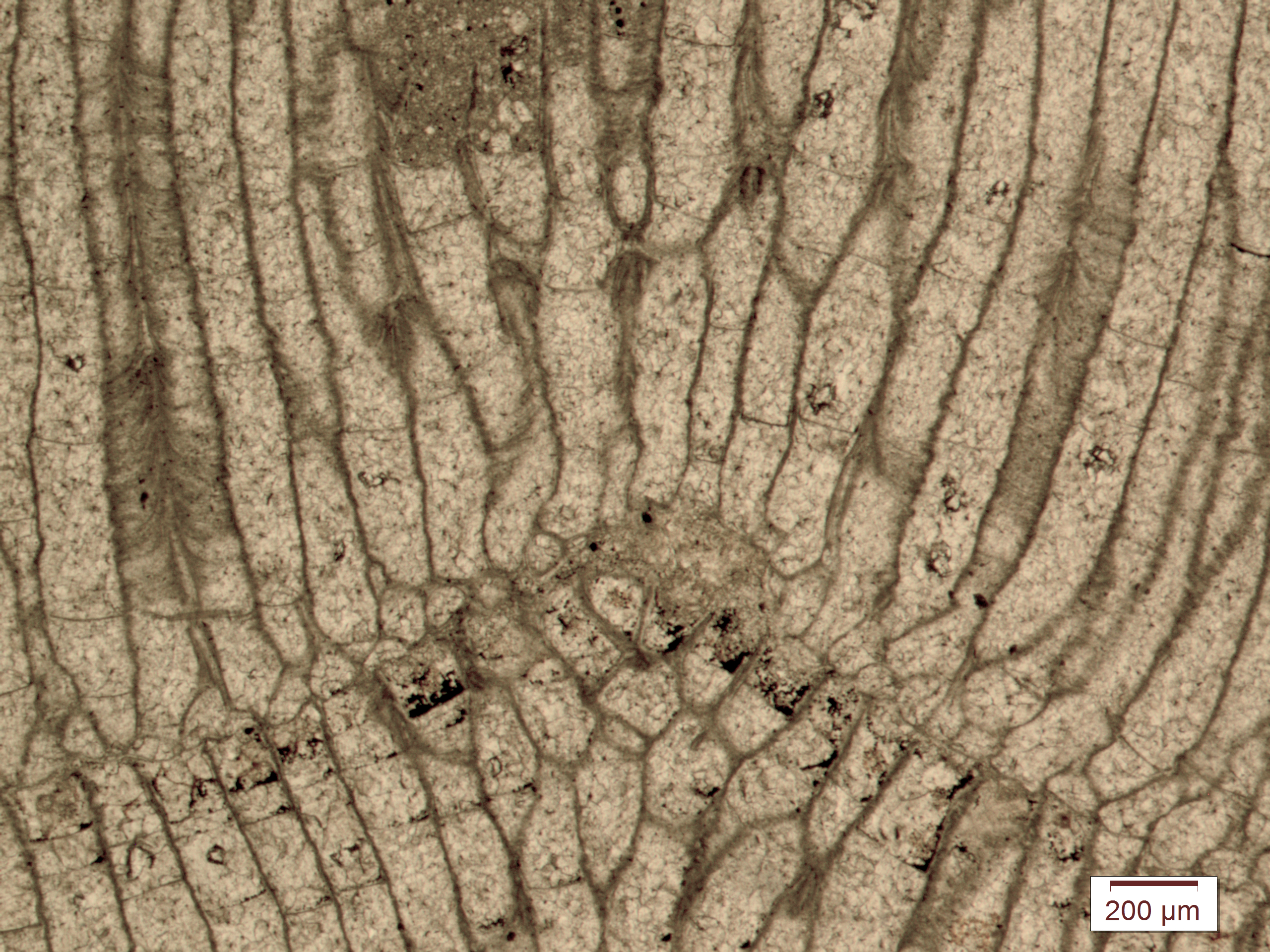
Histologic section of a fossilized invertebrate. Ordovician bryozoan.

Chemical fixatives are used to preserve and maintain the structure of tissues and cells; fixation also hardens tissues which aids in cutting the thin sections of tissue needed for observation under the microscope. Fixatives generally preserve tissues (and cells) by irreversibly cross-linking proteins. The most widely used fixative for light microscopy is 10% neutral buffered formalin, or NBF (4% formaldehyde in phosphate buffered saline).

For electron microscopy, the most commonly used fixative is glutaraldehyde, usually as a 2.5% solution in phosphate buffered saline. Other fixatives used for electron microscopy are osmium tetroxide or uranyl acetate.

The main action of these aldehyde fixatives is to cross-link amino groups in proteins through the formation of methylene bridges (−CH_{2}−), in the case of formaldehyde, or by C_{5}H_{10} cross-links in the case of glutaraldehyde. This process, while preserving the structural integrity of the cells and tissue can damage the biological functionality of proteins, particularly enzymes.

Formalin fixation leads to degradation of mRNA, miRNA, and DNA as well as denaturation and modification of proteins in tissues. However, extraction and analysis of nucleic acids and proteins from formalin-fixed, paraffin-embedded tissues is possible using appropriate protocols.

=== Selection and trimming ===
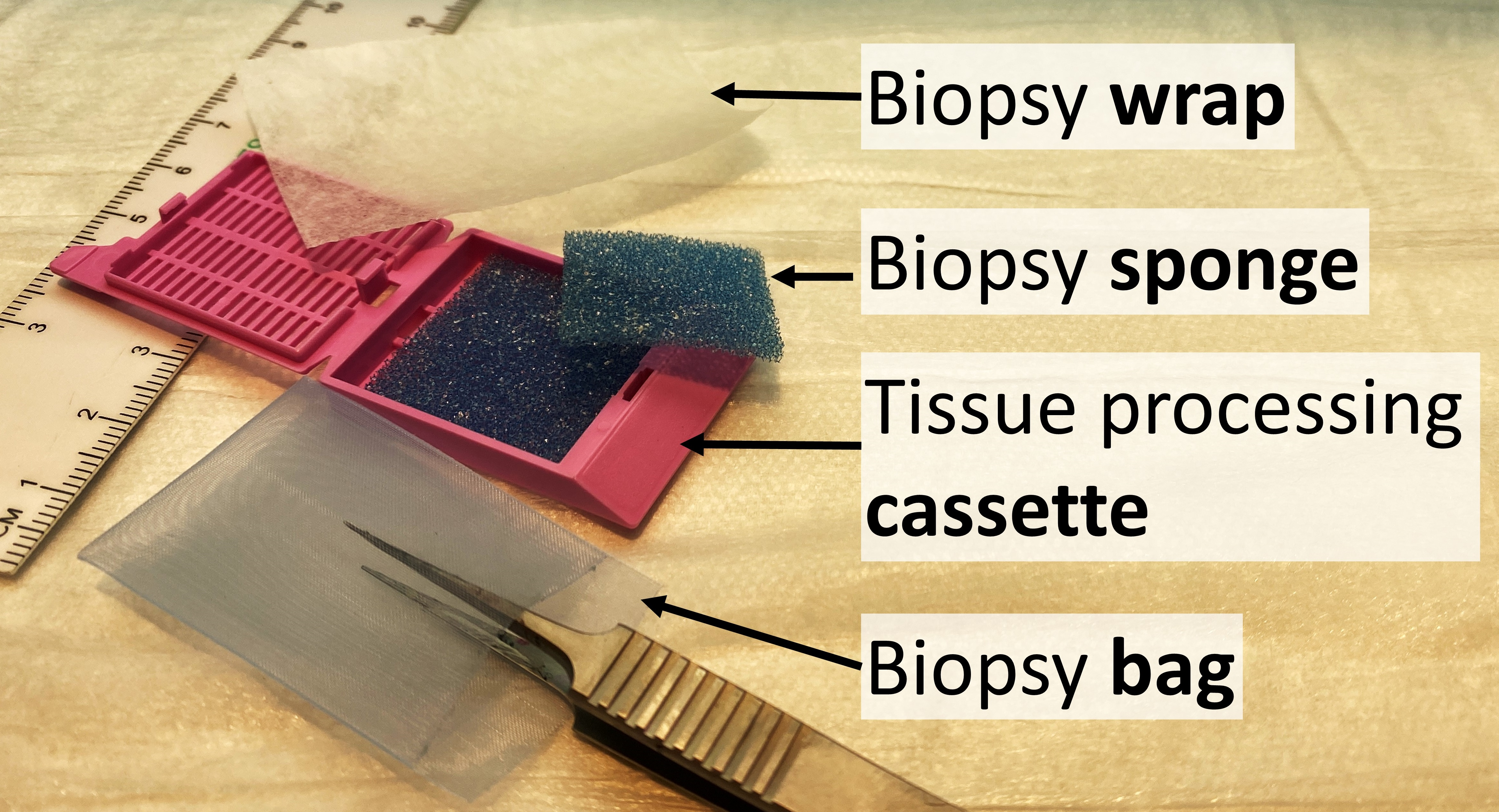
Items used for submitting specimens: (Biopsy) wrap, (biopsy) sponge, (tissue processing) cassette and (biopsy) bag.

Selection is the choice of relevant tissue in cases where it is not necessary to put the entire original tissue mass through further processing. The remainder may remain fixed in case it needs to be examined at a later time.

Trimming is the cutting of tissue samples in order to expose the relevant surfaces for later sectioning. It also creates tissue samples of appropriate size to fit into cassettes.

=== Embedding ===
Tissues are embedded in a harder medium both as a support and to allow the cutting of thin tissue slices. In general, water must first be removed from tissues (dehydration) and replaced with a medium that either solidifies directly, or with an intermediary fluid (clearing) that is miscible with the embedding media.

==== Paraffin wax ====
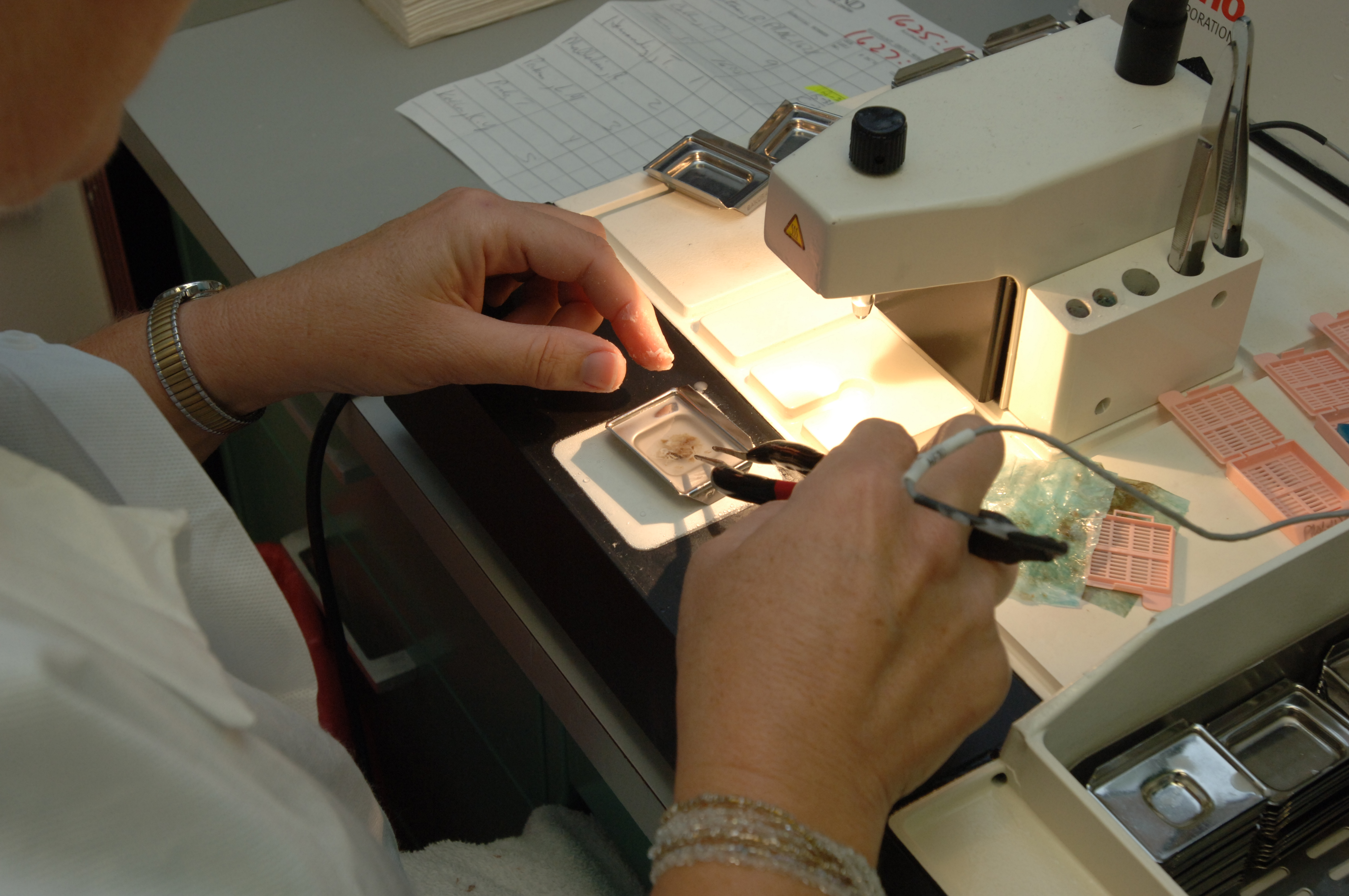
Histologic sample being embedded in paraffin wax (Tissue is held at the bottom of a metal mold, and more molten paraffin is poured over it to fill it.)

For light microscopy, paraffin wax is the most frequently used embedding material. Paraffin is immiscible with water, the main constituent of biological tissue, so it must first be removed in a series of dehydration steps. Samples are transferred through a series of progressively more concentrated ethanol baths, up to 100% ethanol to remove remaining traces of water. Dehydration is followed by a clearing agent (typically xylene although other environmental safe substitutes are in use) which removes the alcohol and is miscible with the wax, finally melted paraffin wax is added to replace the xylene and infiltrate the tissue. In most histology, or histopathology laboratories the dehydration, clearing, and wax infiltration are carried out in tissue processors which automate this process. Once infiltrated in paraffin, tissues are oriented in molds which are filled with wax; once positioned, the wax is cooled, solidifying the block and tissue.

==== Other materials ====
Paraffin wax does not always provide a sufficiently hard matrix for cutting very thin sections (which are especially important for electron microscopy). Paraffin wax may also be too soft in relation to the tissue, the heat of the melted wax may alter the tissue in undesirable ways, or the dehydrating or clearing chemicals may harm the tissue. Alternatives to paraffin wax include, epoxy, acrylic, agar, gelatin, celloidin, and other types of waxes.

In electron microscopy epoxy resins are the most commonly employed embedding media, but acrylic resins are also used, particularly where immunohistochemistry is required.

For tissues to be cut in a frozen state, tissues are placed in a water-based embedding medium. Pre-frozen tissues are placed into molds with the liquid embedding material, usually a water-based glycol, OCT, TBS, Cryogen, or resin, which is then frozen to form hardened blocks.

=== Sectioning ===
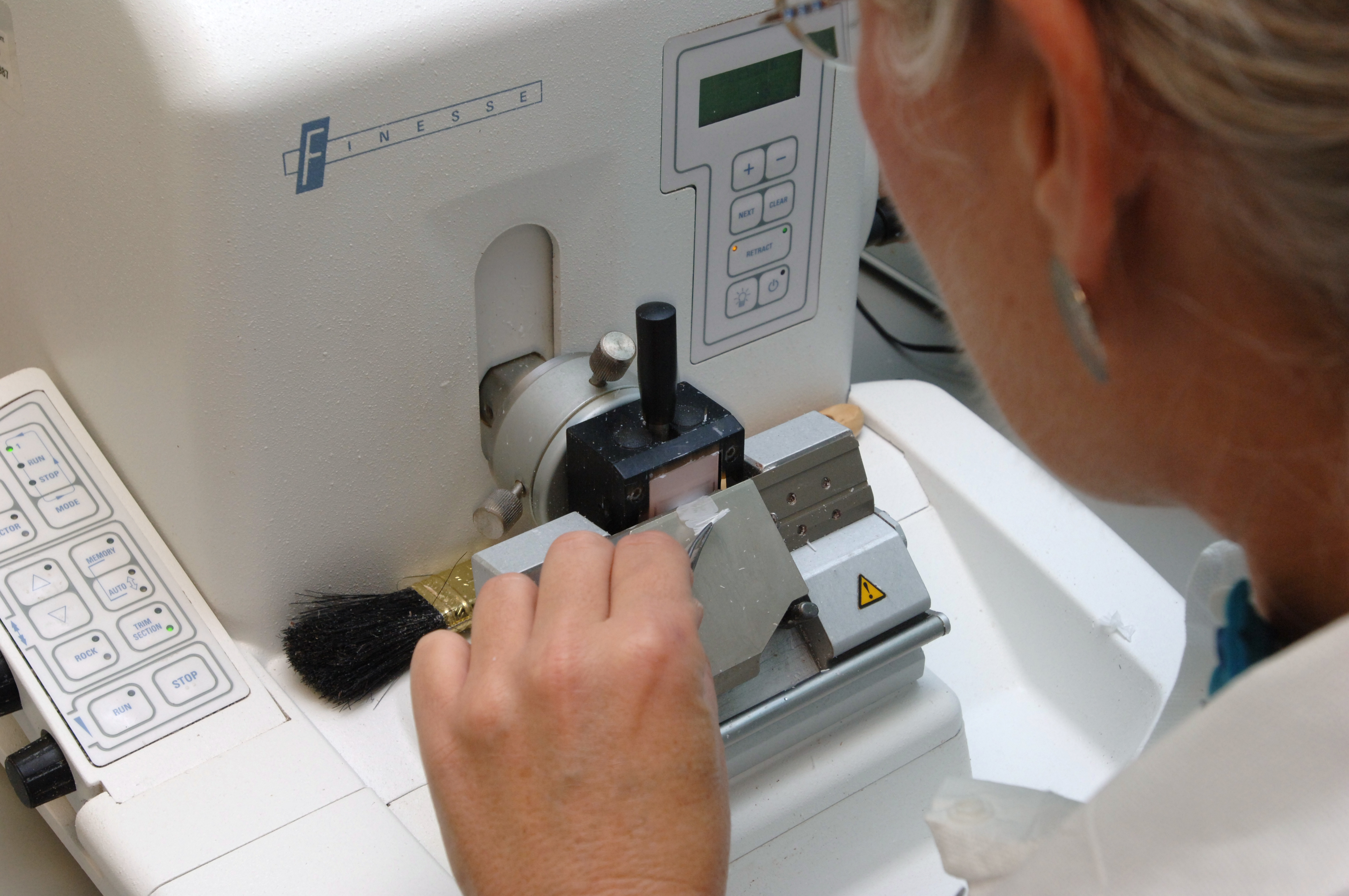
Histologic sample being cut on a microtome

For light microscopy, a knife mounted in a microtome is used to cut tissue sections (typically between 5-15 micrometers thick) which are mounted on a glass microscope slide. For transmission electron microscopy (TEM), a diamond or glass knife mounted in an ultramicrotome is used to cut between 50 and 150 nanometer thick tissue sections.

A limited number of manufacturers are recognized for their production of microtomes, including vibrating microtomes commonly referred to as vibratomes, primarily for research and clinical studies. Additionally, Leica Biosystems is known for its production of products related to light microscopy in the context of research and clinical studies.

=== Staining ===
Biological tissue has little inherent contrast in either the light or electron microscope. Staining is employed to give both contrast to the tissue as well as highlighting particular features of interest. When the stain is used to target a specific chemical component of the tissue (and not the general structure), the term histochemistry is used.

==== Light microscopy ====
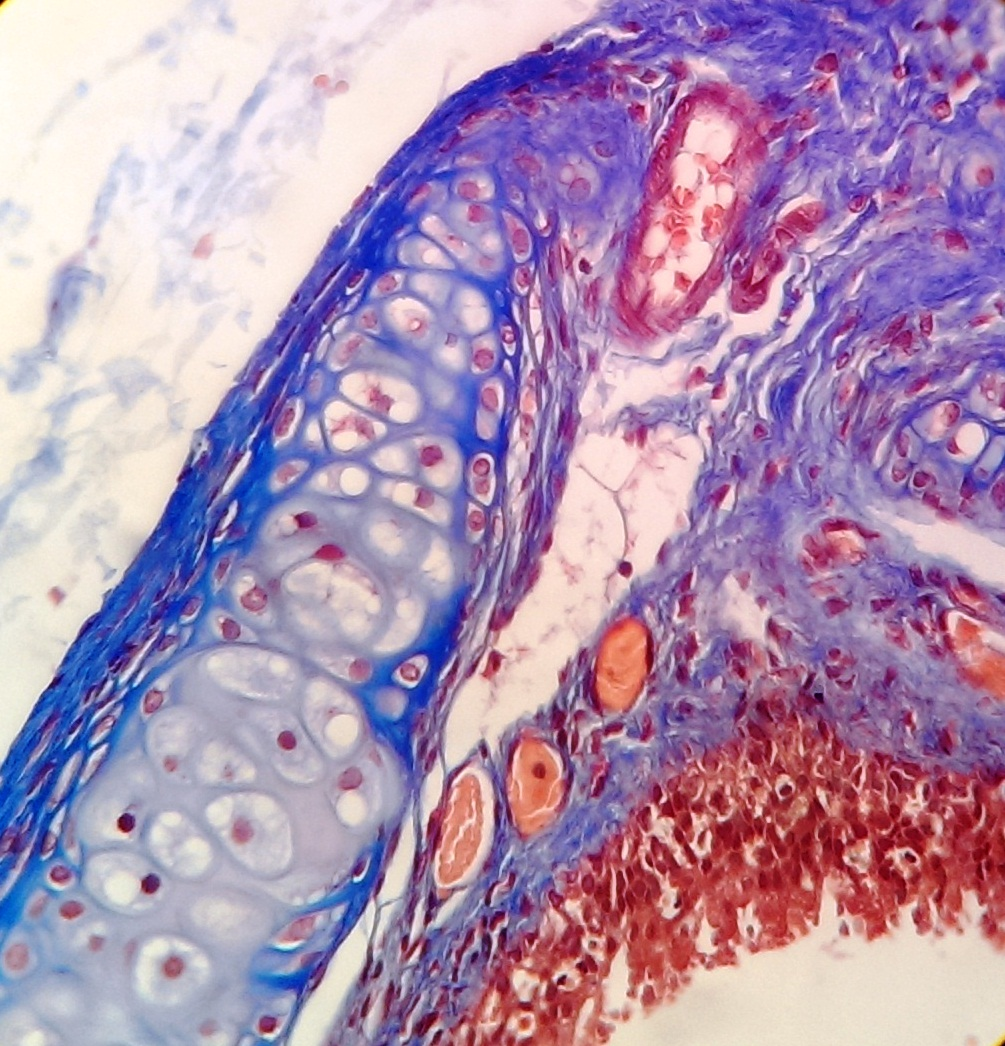
Masson's trichrome staining on rat trachea

Hematoxylin and eosin (H&E stain) is one of the most commonly used stains in histology to show the general structure of the tissue. Hematoxylin stains cell nuclei blue; eosin, an acidic dye, stains the cytoplasm and other tissues in different stains of pink.

In contrast to H&E, which is used as a general stain, there are many techniques that more selectively stain cells, cellular components, and specific substances. A commonly performed histochemical technique that targets a specific chemical is the Perls' Prussian blue reaction, used to demonstrate iron deposits in diseases like hemochromatosis. The Nissl method for Nissl substance and Golgi's method (and related silver stains) are useful in identifying neurons are other examples of more specific stains.

==== Historadiography ====
In historadiography, a slide (sometimes stained histochemically) is X-rayed. More commonly, autoradiography is used in visualizing the locations to which a radioactive substance has been transported within the body, such as cells in S phase (undergoing DNA replication) which incorporate tritiated thymidine, or sites to which radiolabeled nucleic acid probes bind in in situ hybridization. For autoradiography on a microscopic level, the slide is typically dipped into liquid nuclear tract emulsion, which dries to form the exposure film. Individual silver grains in the film are visualized with dark field microscopy.

==== Immunohistochemistry ====
Recently, antibodies have been used to specifically visualize proteins, carbohydrates, and lipids. This process is called immunohistochemistry, or when the stain is a fluorescent molecule, immunofluorescence. This technique has greatly increased the ability to identify categories of cells under a microscope. Other advanced techniques, such as nonradioactive in situ hybridization, can be combined with immunochemistry to identify specific DNA or RNA molecules with fluorescent probes or tags that can be used for immunofluorescence and enzyme-linked fluorescence amplification (especially alkaline phosphatase and tyramide signal amplification). Fluorescence microscopy and confocal microscopy are used to detect fluorescent signals with good intracellular detail.

==== Electron microscopy ====
For electron microscopy heavy metals are typically used to stain tissue sections. Uranyl acetate and lead citrate are commonly used to impart contrast to tissue in the electron microscope.

=== Specialized techniques ===
==== Cryosectioning ====
Similar to the frozen section procedure employed in medicine, cryosectioning is a method to rapidly freeze, cut, and mount sections of tissue for histology. The tissue is usually sectioned on a cryostat or freezing microtome. The frozen sections are mounted on a glass slide and may be stained to enhance the contrast between different tissues. Unfixed frozen sections can be used for studies requiring enzyme localization in tissues and cells. Tissue fixation is required for certain procedures such as antibody-linked immunofluorescence staining. Frozen sections are often prepared during surgical removal of tumors to allow rapid identification of tumor margins, as in Mohs surgery, or determination of tumor malignancy, when a tumor is discovered incidentally during surgery.

==== Ultramicrotomy ====
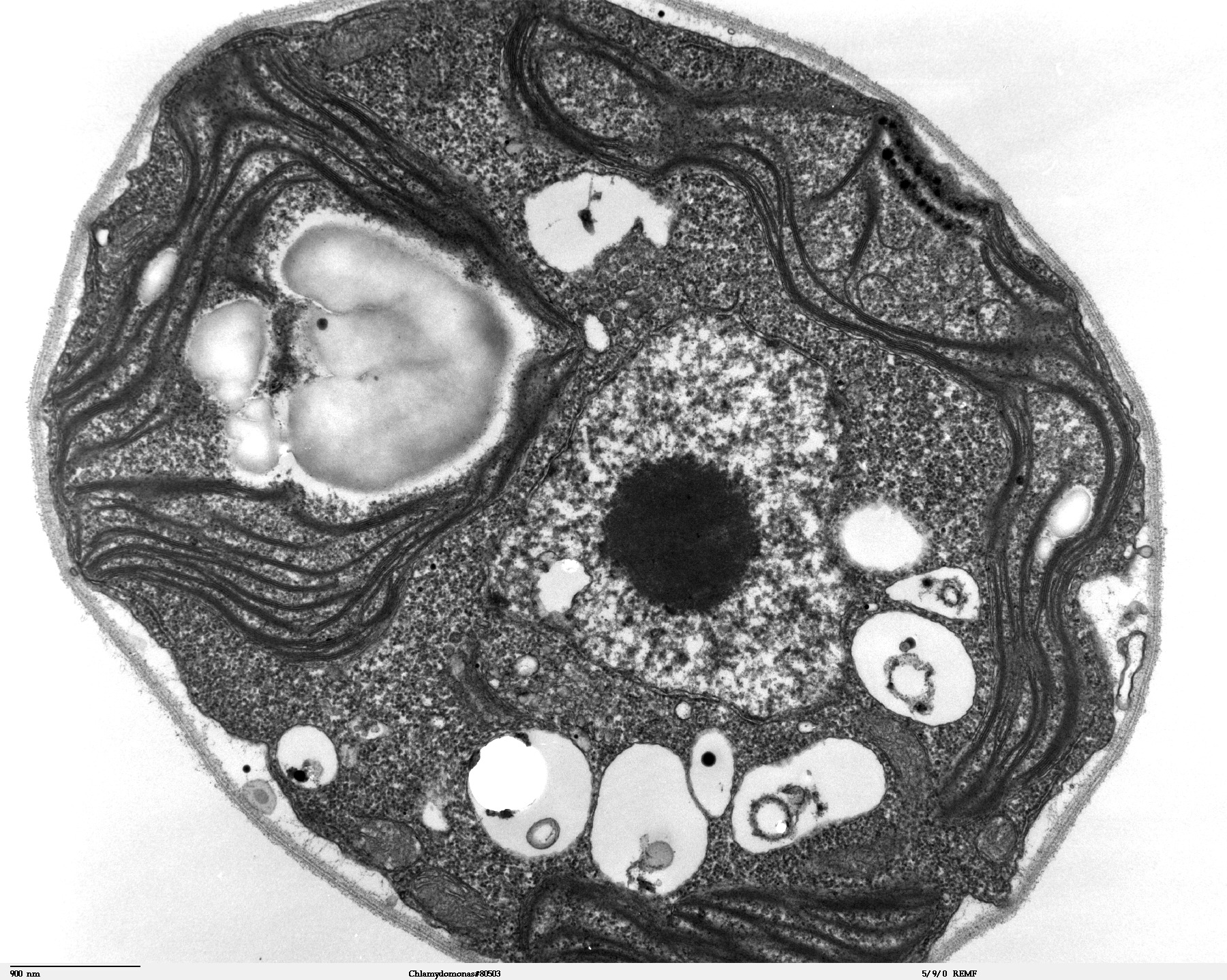
Green algae under a Transmission electron microscope

Ultramicrotomy is a method of preparing extremely thin sections for transmission electron microscope (TEM) analysis. Tissues are commonly embedded in epoxy or other plastic resin. Very thin sections (less than 0.1 micrometer in thickness) are cut using diamond or glass knives on an ultramicrotome.

=== Artifacts ===
Artifacts are structures or features in tissue that interfere with normal histological examination. Artifacts interfere with histology by changing the tissues appearance and hiding structures. Tissue processing artifacts can include pigments formed by fixatives, shrinkage, washing out of cellular components, color changes in different tissues types and alterations of the structures in the tissue. An example is mercury pigment left behind after using Zenker's fixative to fix a section. Formalin fixation can also leave a brown to black pigment under acidic conditions.

== History ==
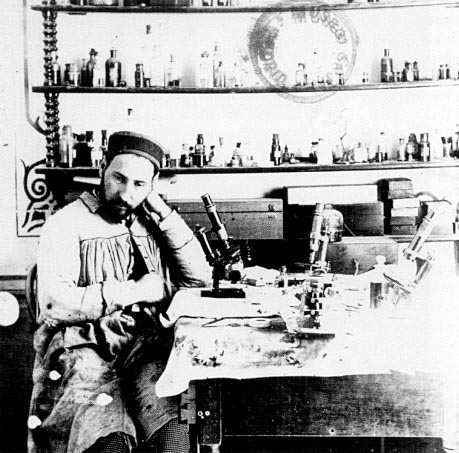
Santiago Ramón y Cajal in his laboratory

In the 17th century the Italian Marcello Malpighi used microscopes to study tiny biological entities; some regard him as the founder of the fields of histology and microscopic pathology. Malpighi analyzed several parts of the organs of bats, frogs and other animals under the microscope. While studying the structure of the lung, Malpighi noticed its membranous alveoli and the hair-like connections between veins and arteries, which he named capillaries. His discovery established how the oxygen breathed in enters the blood stream and serves the body.

In the 19th century histology was an academic discipline in its own right. The French anatomist Xavier Bichat introduced the concept of tissue in anatomy in 1801, and the term "histology" (German: Histologie), coined to denote the "study of tissues", first appeared in a book by Karl Mayer in 1819. Bichat described twenty-one human tissues, which can be subsumed under the four categories currently accepted by histologists. The usage of illustrations in histology, deemed as useless by Bichat, was promoted by Jean Cruveilhier.

In the early 1830s Purkynĕ invented a microtome with high precision.

During the 19th century many fixation techniques were developed by Adolph Hannover (solutions of chromates and chromic acid), Franz Schulze and Max Schultze (osmic acid), Alexander Butlerov (formaldehyde) and Benedikt Stilling (freezing).

Mounting techniques were developed by Rudolf Heidenhain (1824–1898), who introduced gum Arabic; Salomon Stricker (1834–1898), who advocated a mixture of wax and oil; and Andrew Pritchard (1804–1884) who, in 1832, used a gum/isinglass mixture. In the same year, Canada balsam appeared on the scene, and in 1869 Edwin Klebs (1834–1913) reported that he had for some years embedded his specimens in paraffin.

The 1906 Nobel Prize in Physiology or Medicine was awarded to histologists Camillo Golgi and Santiago Ramon y Cajal. They had conflicting interpretations of the neural structure of the brain based on differing interpretations of the same images. Ramón y Cajal won the prize for his correct theory, and Golgi for the silver-staining technique that he invented to make it possible.

== Future directions ==
=== In vivo histology ===
There is interest in developing techniques for in vivo histology (predominantly using MRI), which would enable doctors to non-invasively gather information about healthy and diseased tissues in living patients, rather than from fixed tissue samples.

== See also ==
- National Society for Histotechnology
- Slice preparation
