= Amalia Ballarino =

Nuclear and superconductor scientist

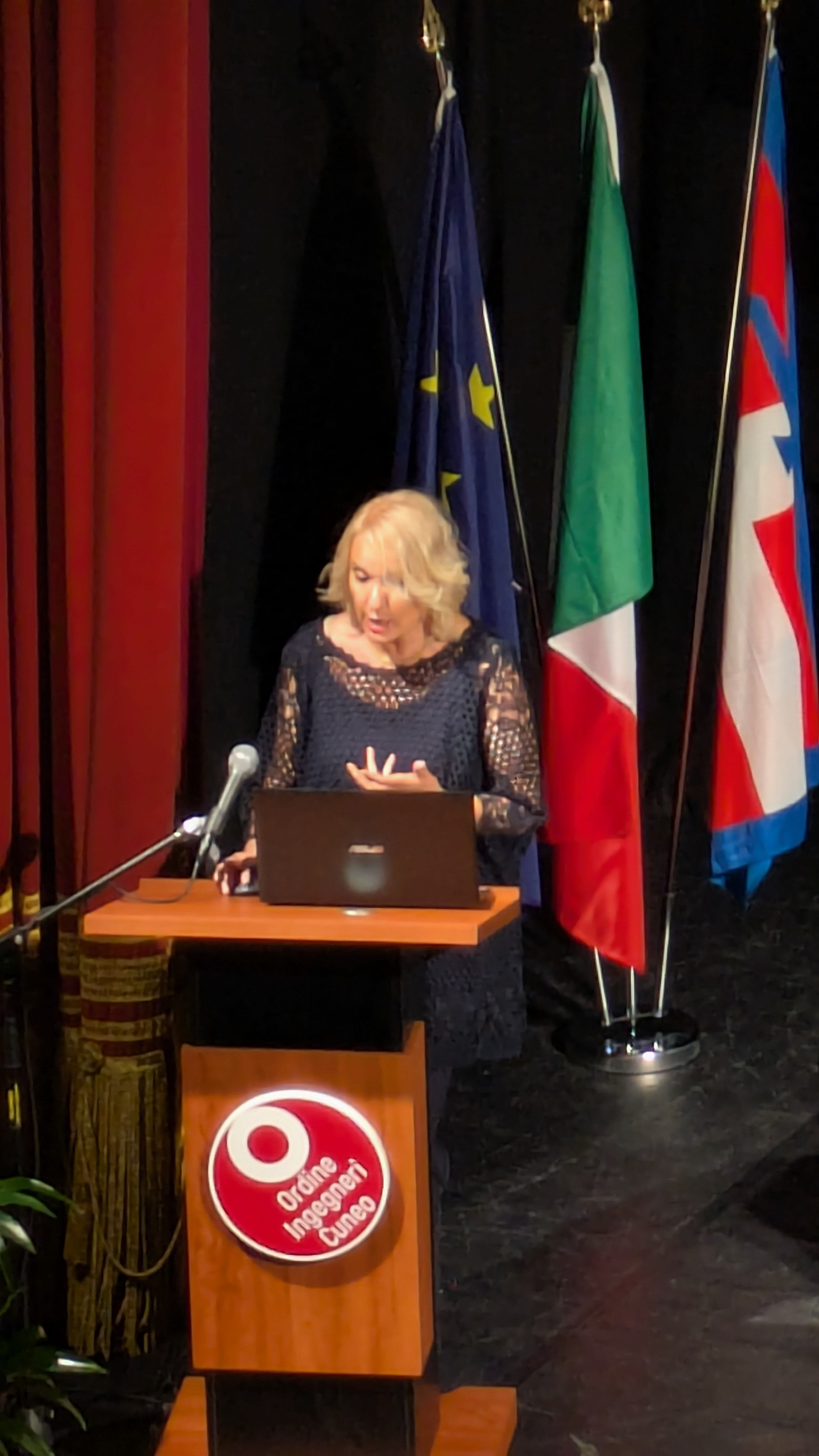
- Education: Polytechnic University of Turin
- Scientific career
- Workplaces: CERN
- Thesis: Discendenti di corrente realizzati con materiale superconduttore ad alta temperatura critica per l’alimentazione dei magneti del Large Hadron Collider (1997)

Amalia Ballarino is a nuclear and superconductor scientist. She currently serves as leader of CERN’s magnets, superconductors, and cryostats group.

== Education and career ==
She earned her master's degree and doctorate in nuclear engineering from the Polytechnic University of Turin with a thesis in "Pioneering study on the use of newly discovered high temperature superconductors in current leads", running her doctorate work at CERN, where she has worked since 1997.

She participated in the designing of the Large Hadron Collider between 1998 and 2008. In 2006, she was named Superconductor Industry Person of the Year by Superconductor Week. In 2010, she was named head of CERN’s superconductors group. She was a plenary speaker at EUCAS 2019 in Glasgow. She was elected onto the board of directors for the Applied Superconductivity Conference in 2012. She is a member of Technical Committee TC 90 of the International Electrotechnical Commission, in the tensile test and electro-mechanical properties of composite superconductors working group.

She has led the design of the electrical transmission lines for the High Luminosity LHC Project, scheduled to come online in 2027, basing it off of superconducting MgB2 electrical transfers. In June 2020, the line broke a world record for electrical intensity, transporting 54 000 amperes across a distance of 60 metres. Her team had previously set a world record of 20 000 amperes in 2014, and patented a method for manufacturer high temperature superconducting tape.

== Recognition ==
In 2006 Amalia Ballarino was awarded the Superconductor Industry Person of the Year, for her leadership in developing the LHC’s high-temperature superconducting current leads, the first large-scale commercial application of HTS.

In July 2021, she was awarded the James Wong Award from the Institute of Electrical and Electronics Engineers for her significant and continuing contributions in the field of superconducting materials.

In may 2022, she was awarded the Amelia Earhart by Zonta club for "woman who flight hight in science".
