= Frozen tissue array =

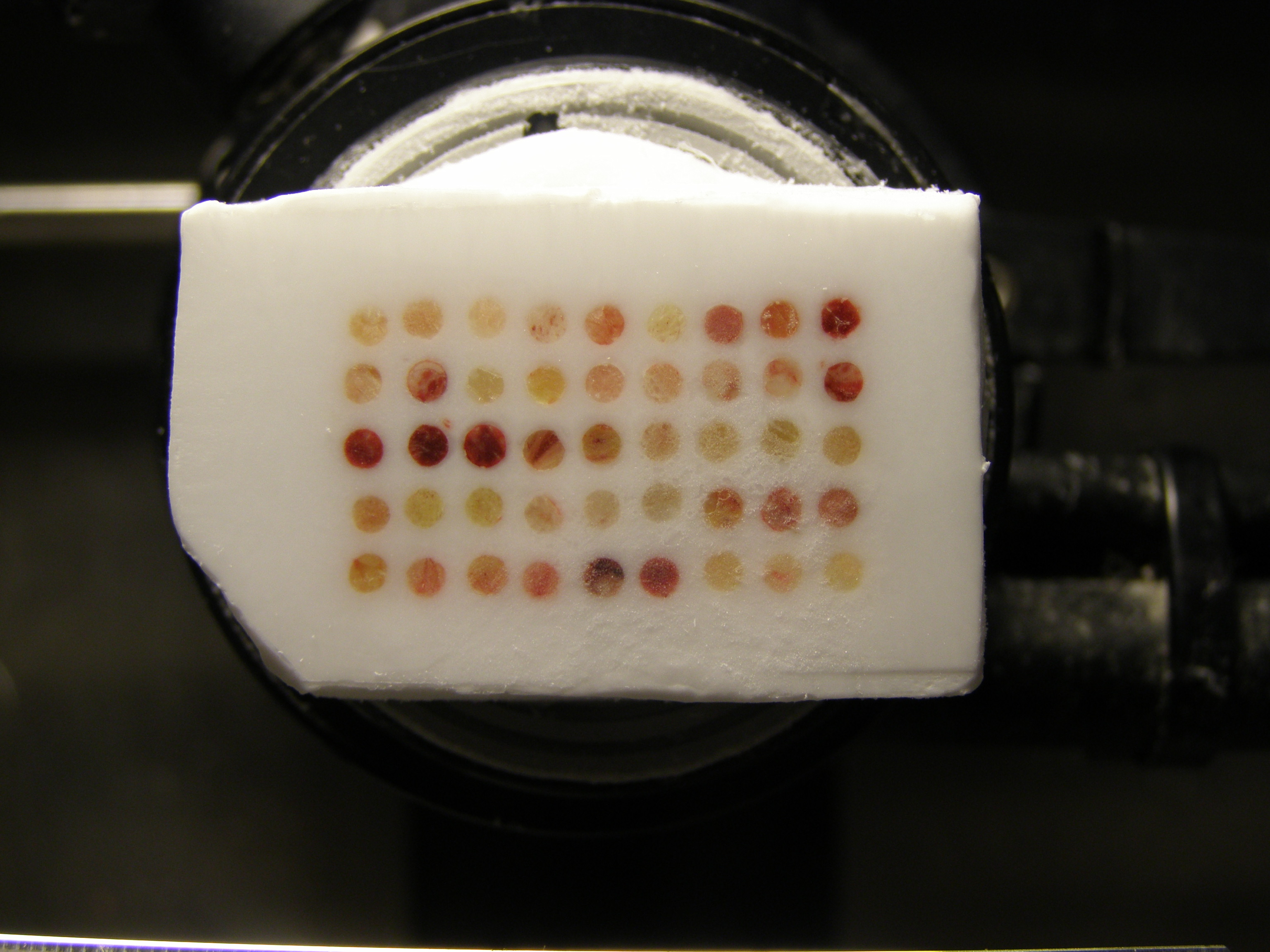
A frozen tissue array block.

Frozen tissue array consists of fresh frozen tissues in which up to 50 separate tissue cores are assembled in array fashion to allow simultaneous histological analysis.

== History ==
Paraffin tissue array was developed during late years in the 1980s; this array can help scientists high throughput analyze gene and protein expressions in multiple tissue samples, especially analyze different protein levels with antibodies by immunohistochemistry. Various paraffin tissue arrays are now commercially available from many biotech companies. Most of the arrays can be easily made by microarraying instrument (Beecher Instruments Inc.). However, paraffin embedded tissues have limitations. Buffered formalin solutions cross link proteins and nucleic acids when they are used for fix tissues. The DNA, RNA, and protein within the tissues are damaged in various levels during the fixation. Therefore, many scientific experimental results from formalin fixed tissues are not reliable. Since frozen tissue sections don't go through any fixation procedures, and therefore, the DNA, RNA, and protein in frozen tissues retain their native characteristics much more than in paraffin embedded tissues. Scientists who have been developing antibodies for therapeutic purpose all need their preliminary results from frozen tissues to get approval from FDA. Consequently, frozen tissue array should be the best tool for high throughput analysis on this purpose.

== Procedure ==
Frozen tissue cores with 2 mm diameter from the regions of interest are removed from frozen tissue OCT blocks at different freezing temperature since each tissue type has their own temperature preference at frozen stage. Then all the frozen tissue cores are inserted in a recipient OCT frozen block in a precisely spaced, array pattern. Sections from this block are cut using a cryostat, mounted on a microscope slide and then analyzed by any method of standard histological analysis. Each frozen tissue array block can be cut into 100–500 sections, which can be subjected to independent tests. Tests commonly employed in frozen tissue array include immunohistochemistry, and in situ hybridization.

== See also ==
- Cytomics
- Frozen section procedure
- MicroArray and Gene Expression (MAGE)
