= Frozen section procedure =

Rapid histological sectioning procedure

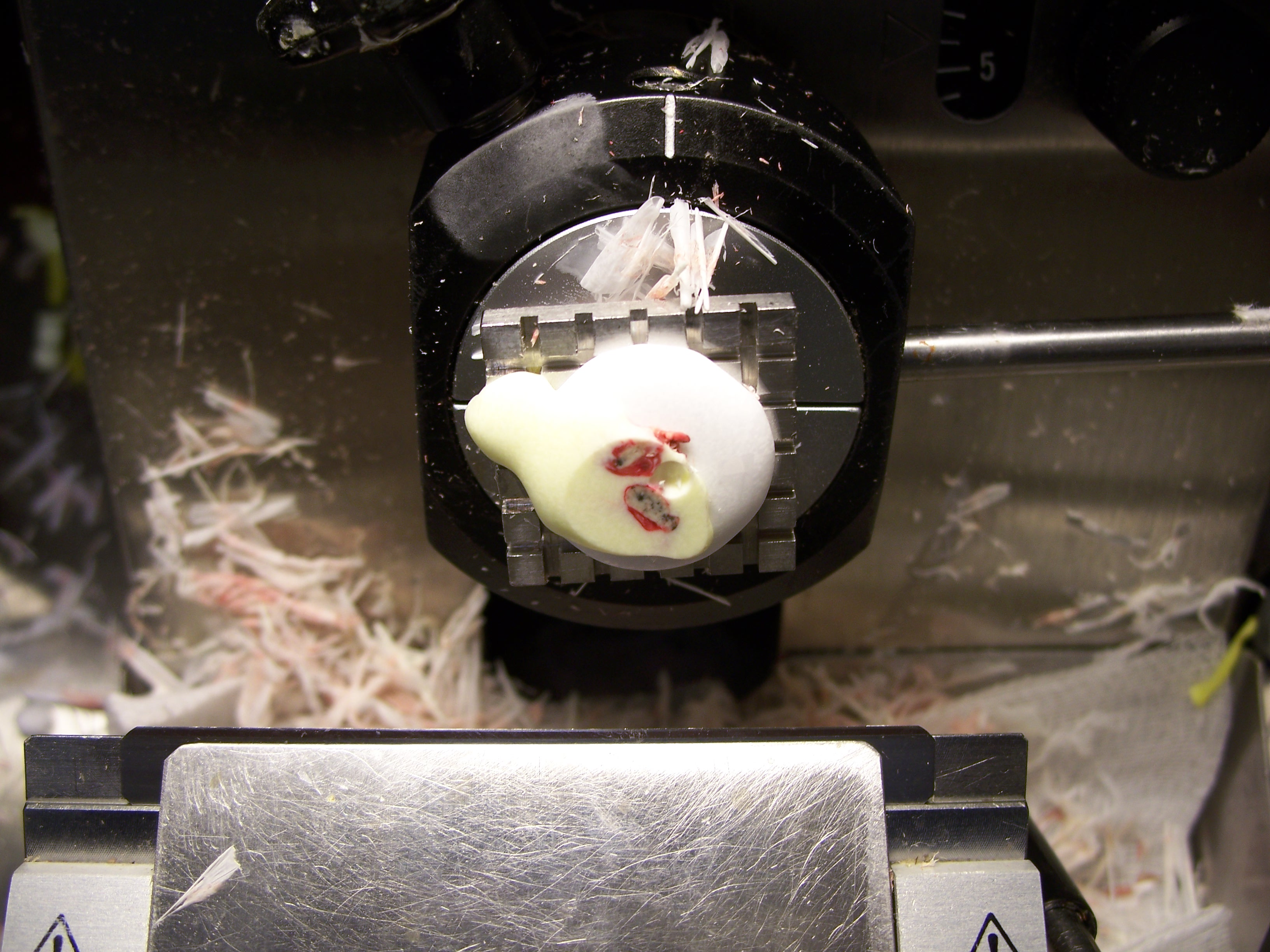
Tissue embedded within optimal cutting temperature compound (OCT), mounted on a chuck in a cryostat, and ready for section production

The frozen section procedure is a pathological laboratory procedure to perform rapid microscopic analysis of a specimen. It is used most often in oncological surgery. The technical name for this procedure is cryosection. The microtome device that cold cuts thin blocks of frozen tissue is called a cryotome.

The quality of the slides produced by frozen section is of lower quality than formalin fixed paraffin embedded tissue processing. While diagnosis can be rendered in many cases, fixed tissue processing is preferred in many conditions for more accurate diagnosis.

The intraoperative consultation is the name given to the whole intervention by the pathologist, which includes not only frozen section but also gross evaluation of the specimen, examination of cytology preparations taken on the specimen (e.g. touch imprints), and aliquoting of the specimen for special studies (e.g. molecular pathology techniques, flow cytometry). The report given by the pathologist is often limited to a "benign" or "malignant" diagnosis, and communicated to the surgeon operating via intercom. When operating on a previously confirmed malignancy, the main purpose of the pathologist is to inform the surgeon if the resection margin is clear of residual cancer, or if residual cancer is present at the resection margin. The method of processing is usually done with the bread loafing technique. But margin controlled surgery (CCPDMA) can be performed using a variety of tissue cutting and mounting methods, including Mohs surgery.

== History ==
The frozen section procedure as practiced today in medical laboratories is based on the description by Louis B. Wilson in 1905. Wilson developed the technique from earlier reports at the request of William Mayo, surgeon and one of the founders of the Mayo Clinic. Earlier reports by Thomas S. Cullen at Johns Hopkins Hospital in Baltimore also involved frozen section, but only after formalin fixation, and pathologist William Welch, also at Hopkins, experimented with Cullen's procedure but without clinical consequences. Hence, Wilson is generally credited with truly pioneering the procedure (Gal & Cagle, 2005).

== Procedure ==
The key instrument for cryosection is the cryostat, which is essentially a microtome inside a freezer. The microtome can be compared to a very accurate "deli" slicer, capable of slicing sections as thin as 1 micrometre. The usual histology slice is cut at 5 to 10 micrometres. The surgical specimen is placed on a metal tissue disc which is then secured in a chuck and frozen rapidly to about −20 to −30 °C. The specimen is placed in a gel-like embedding medium, usually OCT which consists of polyethylene glycol and polyvinyl alcohol; this compound is known by many names and when frozen has the same density as frozen tissue. At this temperature, most tissues become rock-hard. Usually a lower temperature is required for fat or lipid rich tissue. Each tissue has a preferred temperature for processing. Subsequently, it is cut frozen with the microtome portion of the cryostat, the section is picked up on a glass slide and stained (usually with hematoxylin and eosin, the H&E stain). The preparation of the sample is much more rapid than with traditional histology technique (around 10 minutes vs 16 hours). However, the technical quality of the sections is much lower. The entire laboratory can occupy a space less than 9-square-foot (0.84 m^{2}), and minimal ventilation is required compared to a standard wax embedded specimen laboratory.

Steps of cryotomy:

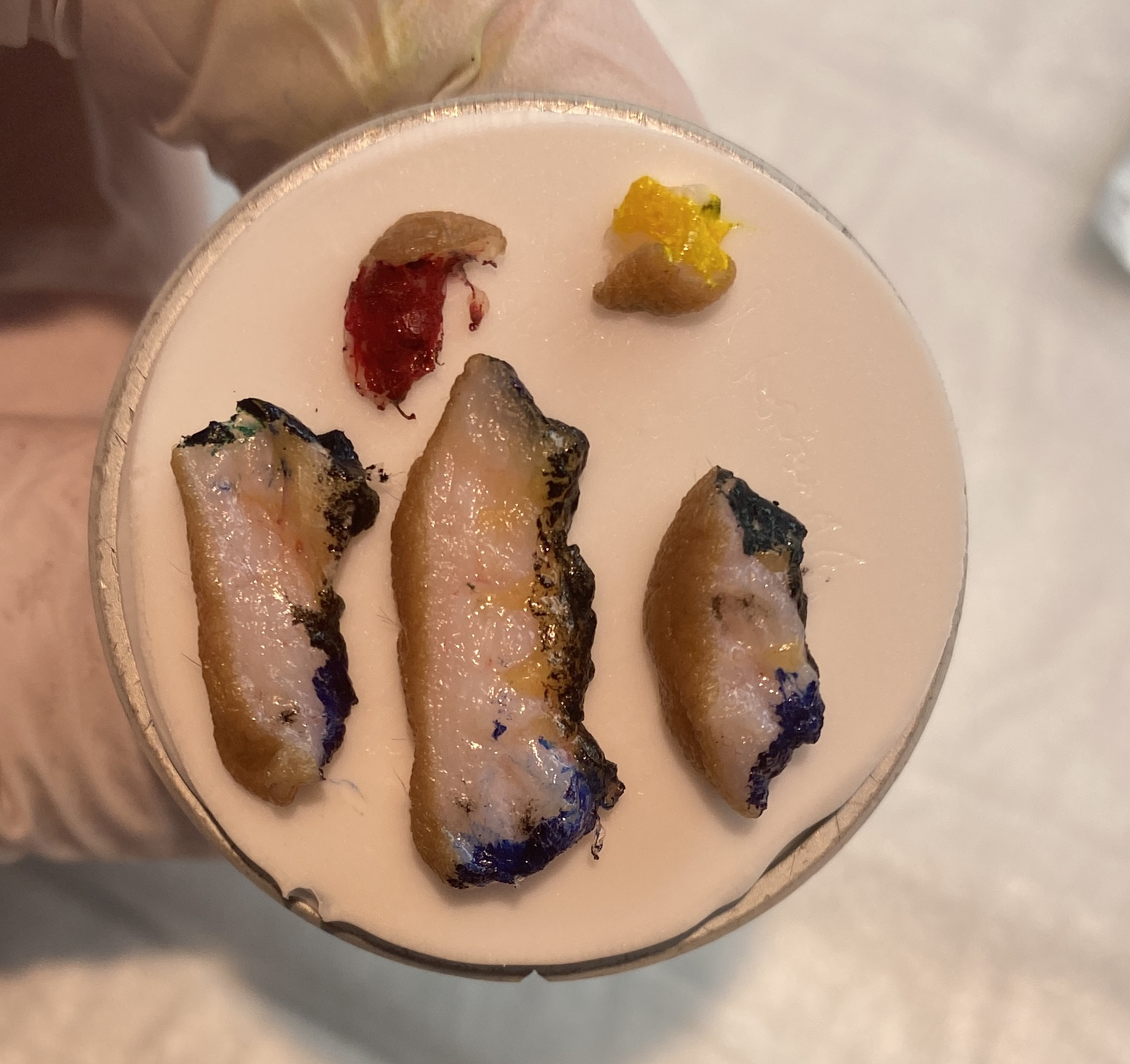
Putting specimens on one or more chucks.

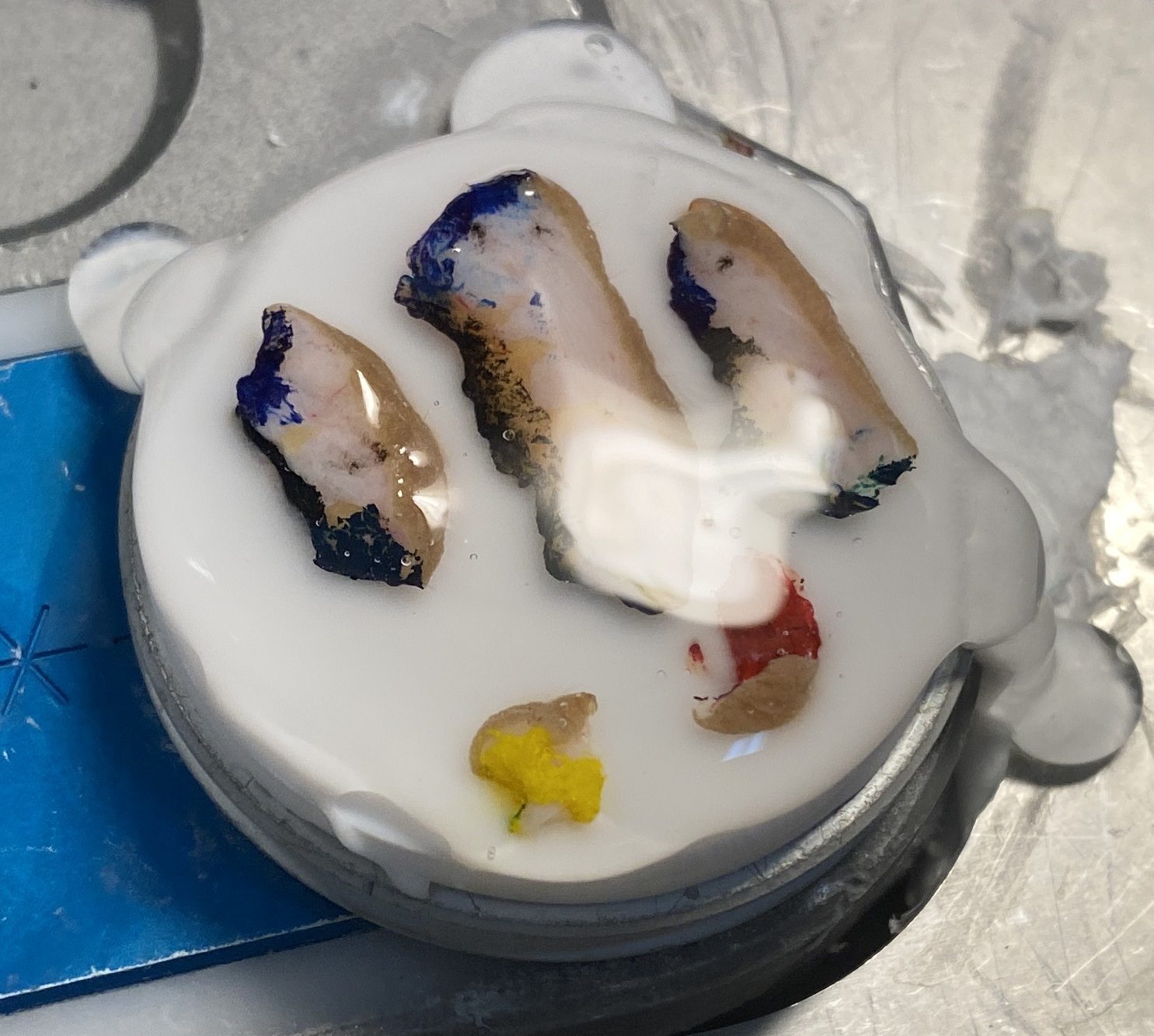
Covering the specimen with embedding medium

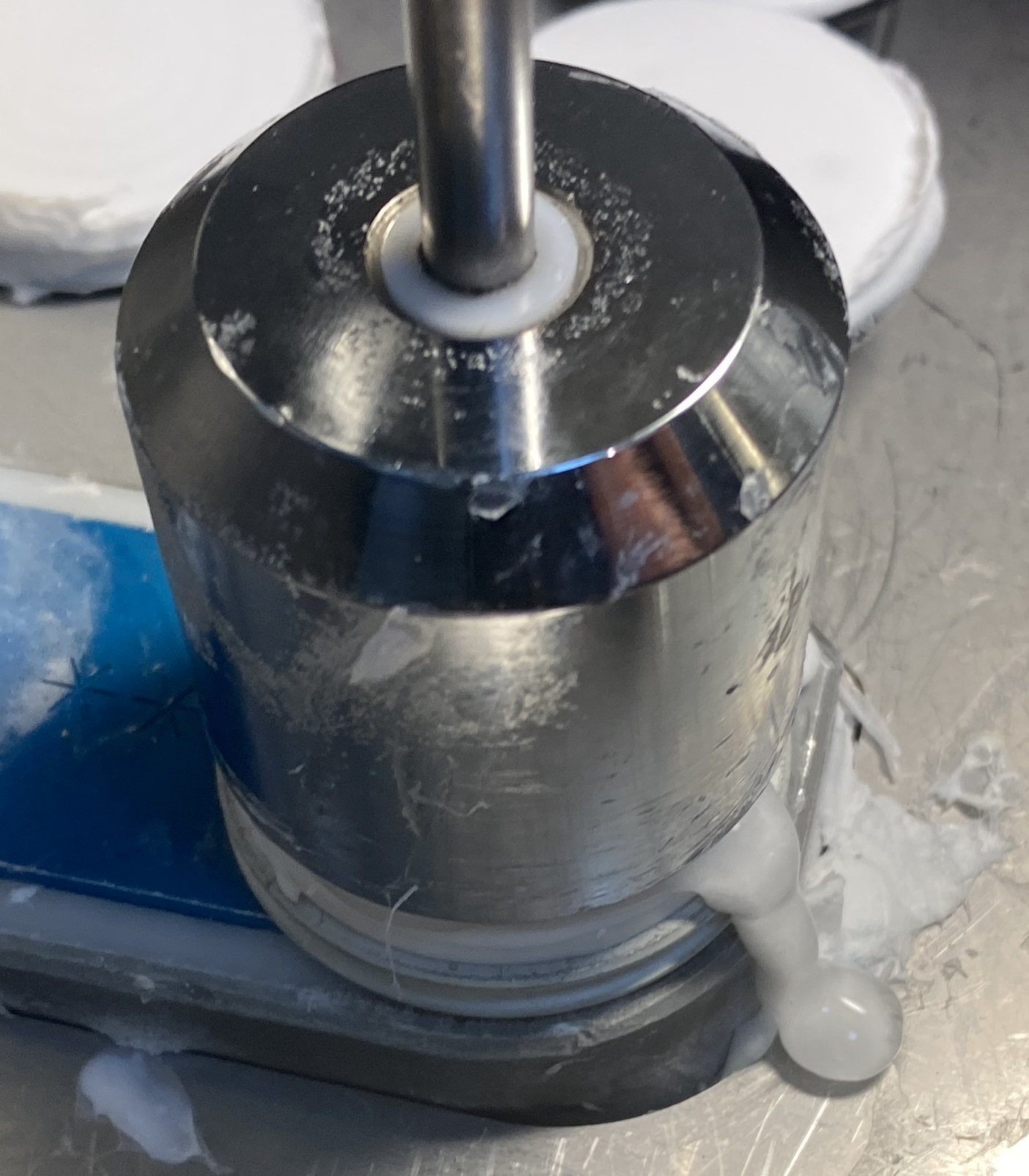
Applying a conductor (unless it's a thin specimen that needs to stand on its side)

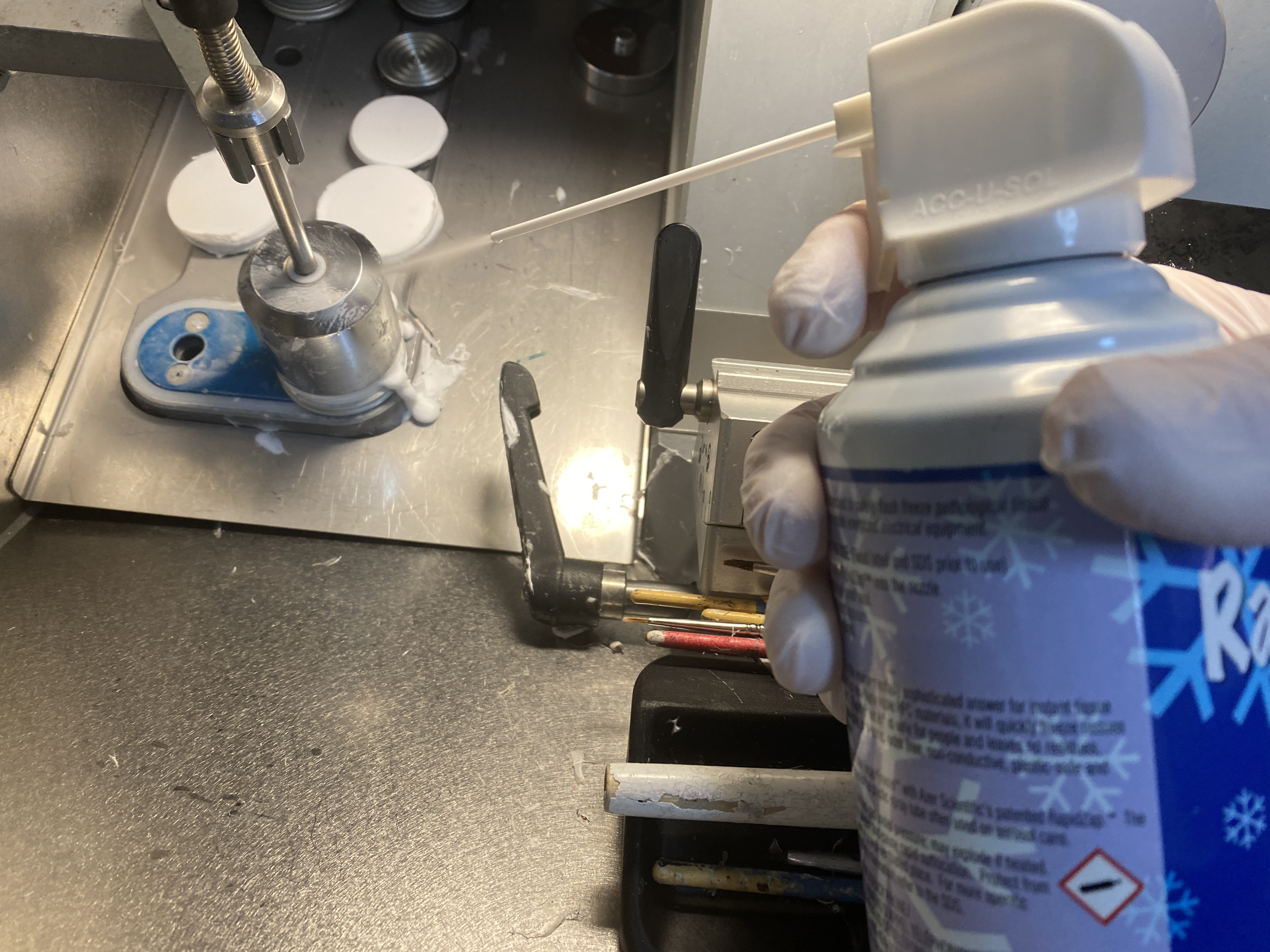
Using freeze spray to quicken the freezing if available

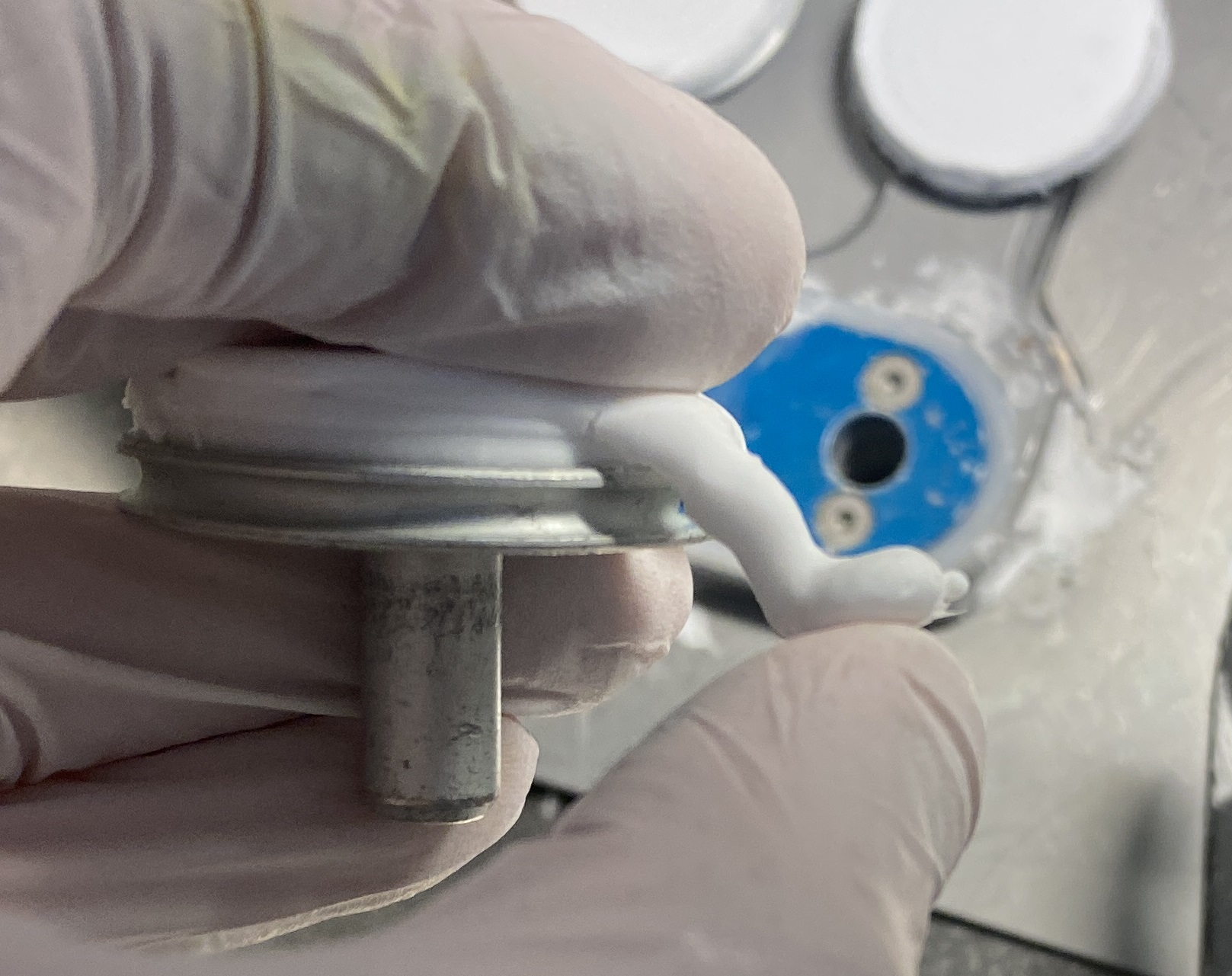
Breaking off any embedding medium that reaches below the chuck's plate

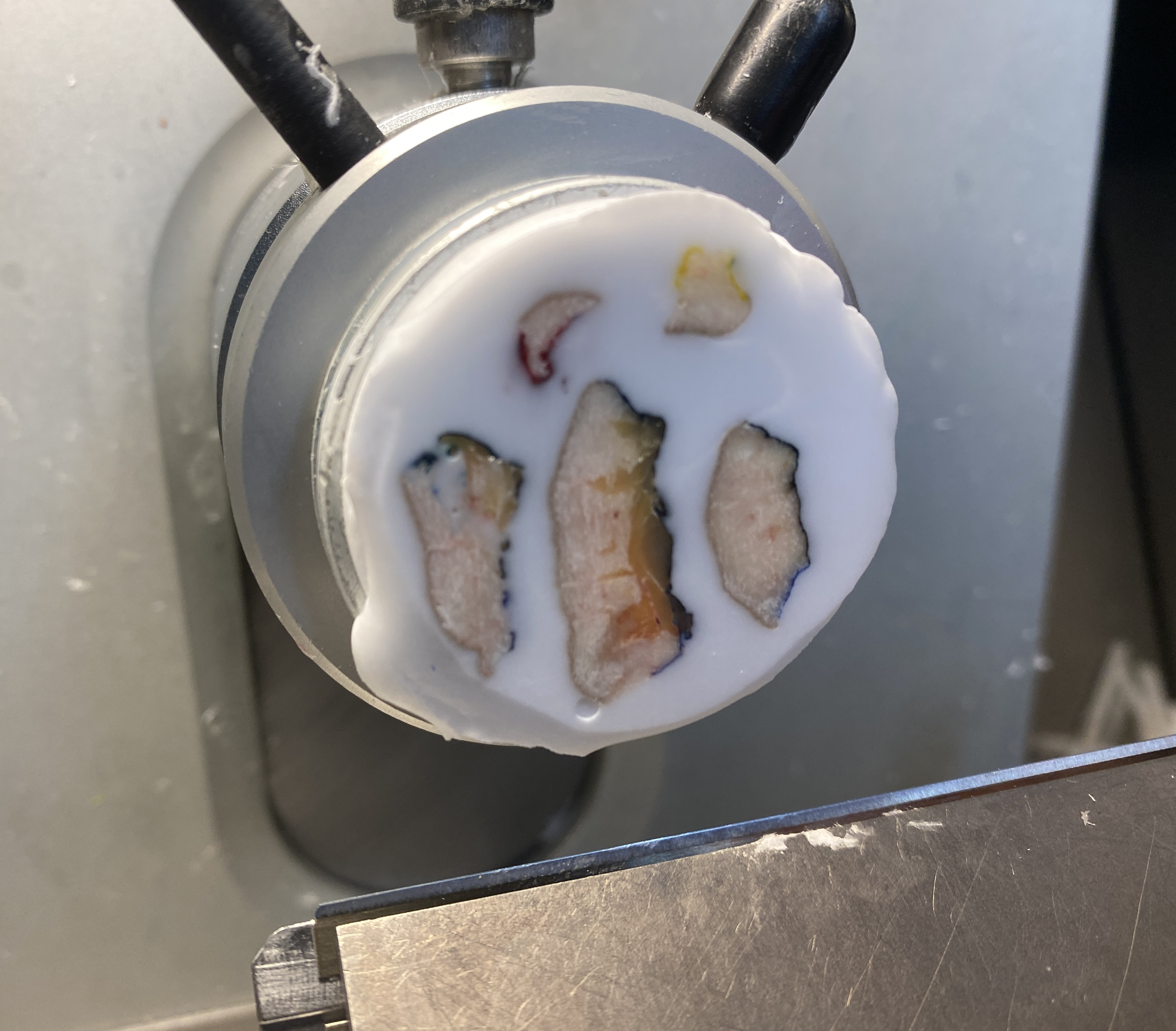
Fastening the chuck on the cryotome and cut relatively thick sections until the full tissue surfaces of interest are exposed

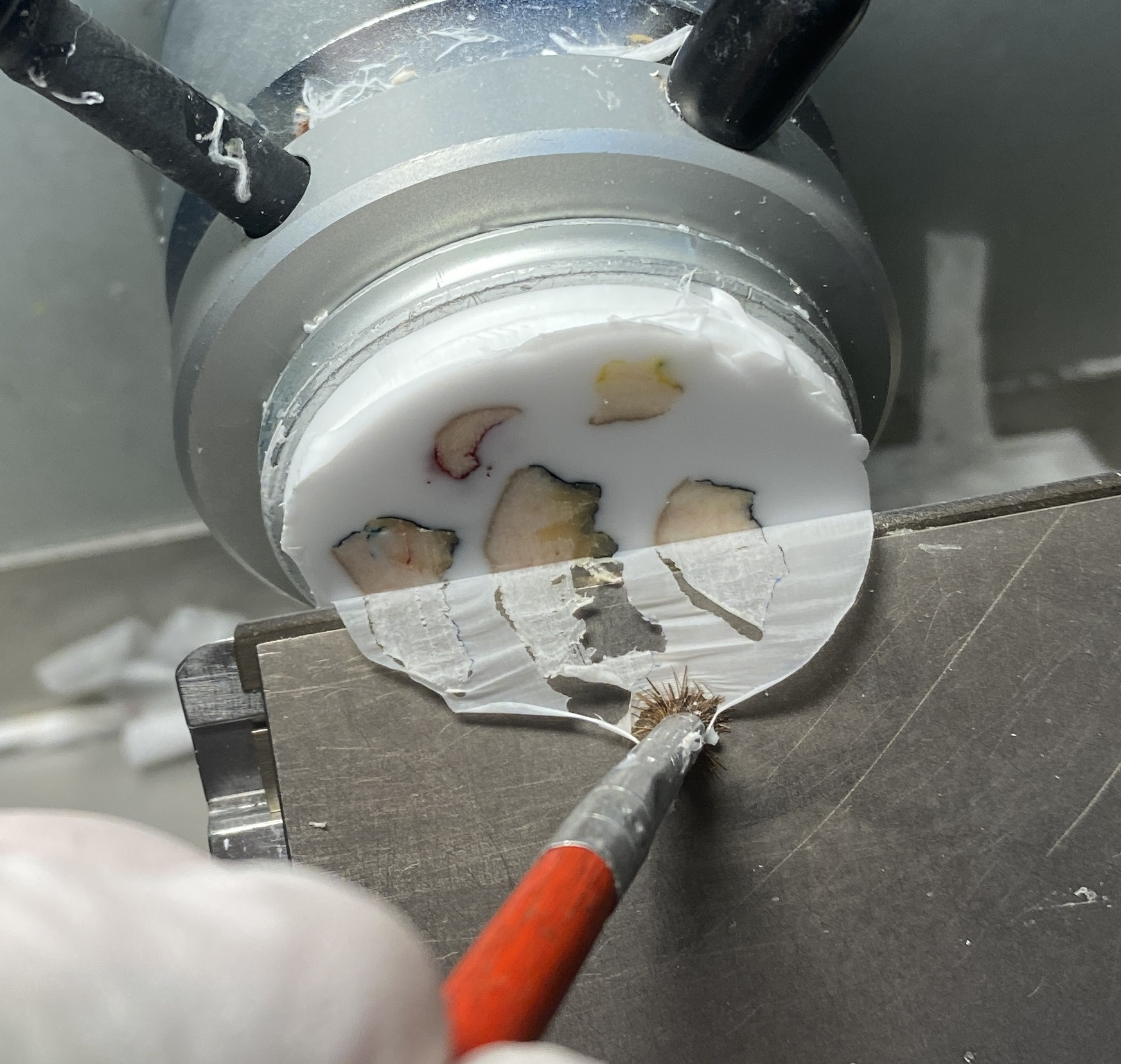
Advancing the specimen over the blade while holding the section down to prevent it from folding onto itself

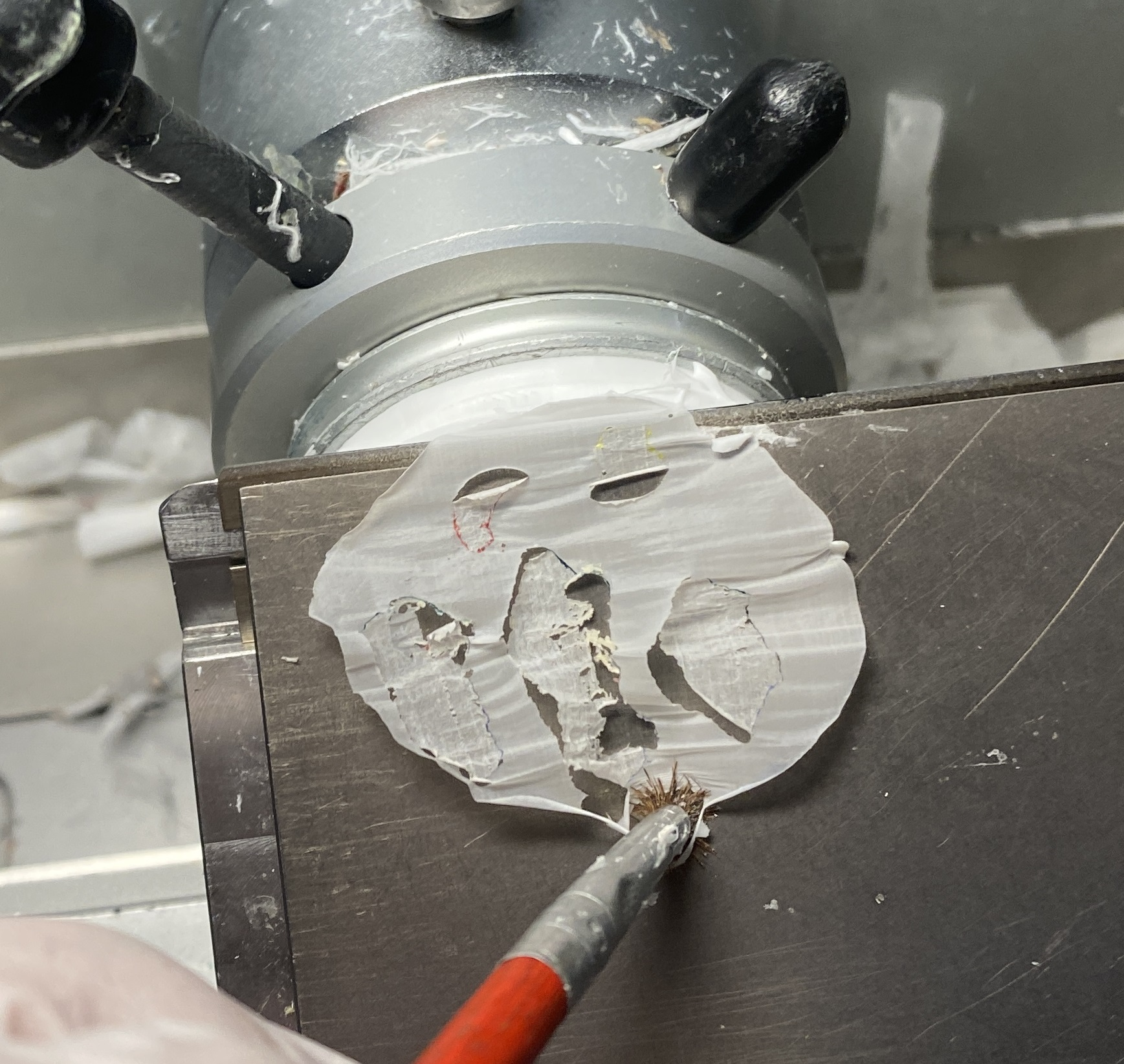
Continue until all the tissue of interest is in the section

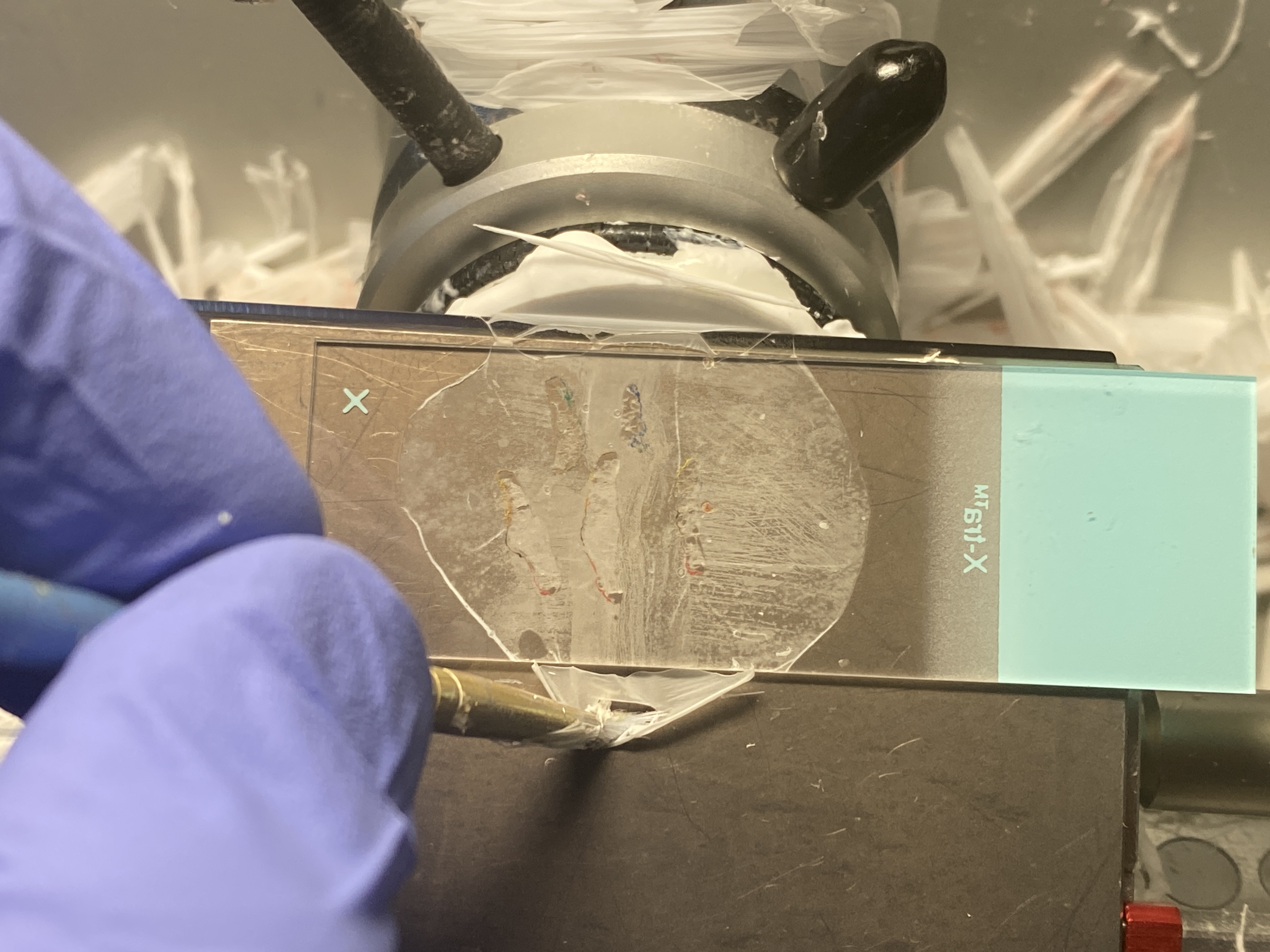
Putting a glass slide on the tissue.

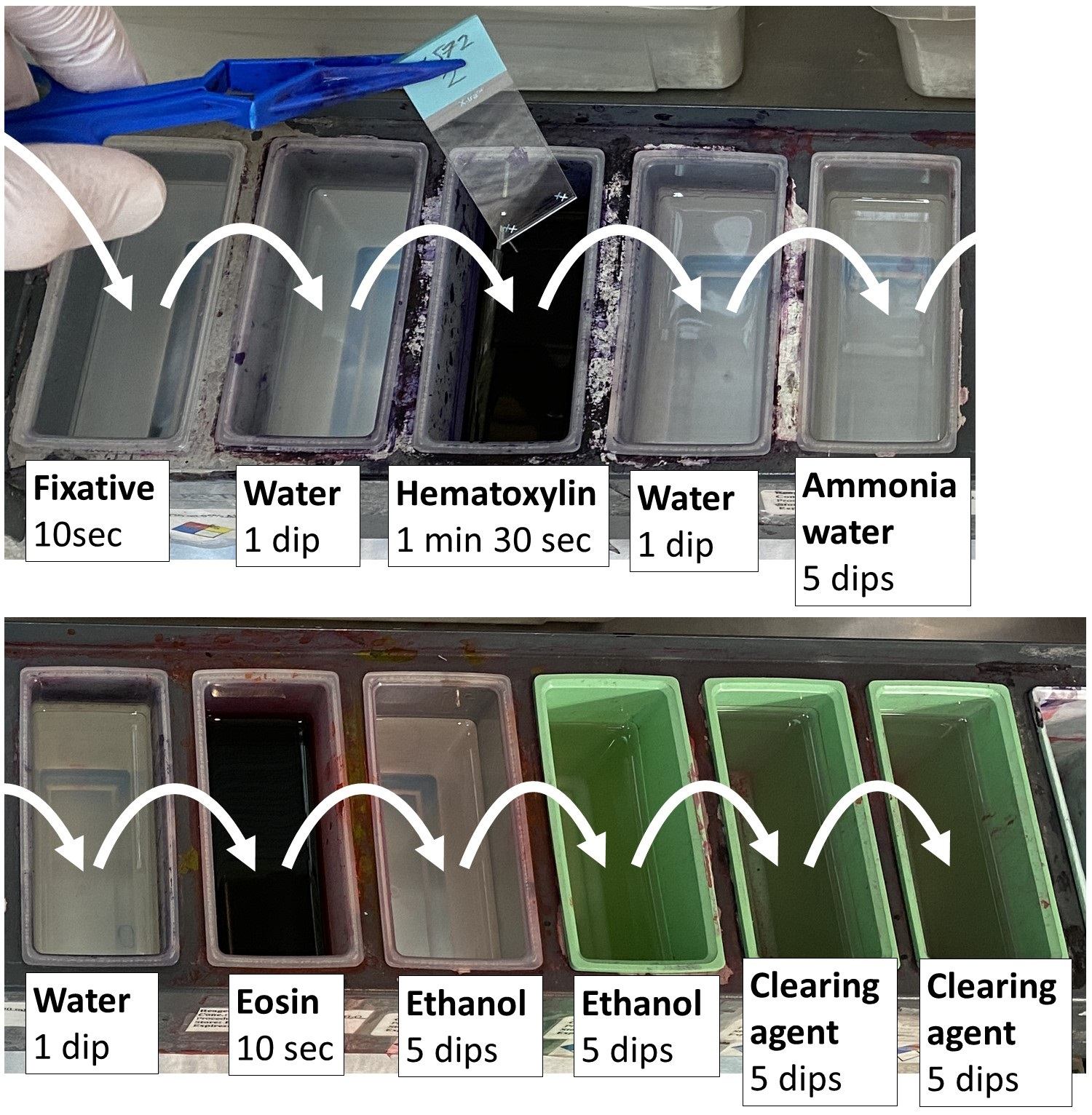
Minimal time in solutions for frozen sections

== Uses ==
The principal use of the frozen section procedure is the examination of tissue while surgery is taking place. This may be for various reasons. In the performance of Mohs surgery, it is a simple method for real-time margin control of a surgical specimen. If a tumor appears to have metastasized, a sample of the suspected metastasis is sent for cryosection to confirm its identity. This will help the surgeon decide whether there is any point in continuing the operation. Usually, aggressive surgery is performed only if there is a chance to cure the patient. If the tumor has metastasized, surgery is usually not curative, and the surgeon will choose a more conservative surgery, or no resection at all. If a tumor has been resected but it is unclear whether the resection margin is free of tumor, an intraoperative consultation is requested to assess the need to make a further resection for clear margins. In a sentinel node procedure, a sentinel node containing tumor tissue prompts a further lymph node dissection, while a benign node will avoid such a procedure.

If surgery is explorative, rapid examination of a lesion might help identify the possible cause of a patient's symptoms. The pathologist is limited by the poor technical quality of the frozen sections. A final diagnosis is rarely offered intraoperatively.

Rarely, cryosections are used to detect the presence of substances lost in the traditional histology technique, for example lipids. They can also be used to detect some antigens masked by formalin. The cryostat is available in a small portable device weighing less than 80 lb (36 kg), to a large stationary device 500 lb (230 kg) or more. The entire histologic laboratory can be carried in one portable box, making frozen section histology a possible tool in primitive medicine.

== Accuracy of diagnosis ==
A Cochrane systematic review published in 2016 analysed all studies that reported diagnostic accuracy of frozen sections in women undergoing surgery for suspicious tumor in ovary. The review concluded that for tumors that were clearly either benign or malignant on frozen section, the accuracy of the diagnosis was good, as confirmed later by regular biopsy. On the contrary, where the frozen section diagnosis was a borderline tumor, neither confirming not ruling out cancer, the diagnosis was less accurate. The review suggests that in such situations of uncertainty, surgeons may choose to perform additional surgery in this group of women at the time of their initial surgery in order to reduce the need for a second operation, as on an average one out of five of these women were subsequently found to have cancer.

== Ultracryotome ==
An ultracryotome, which is a very similar device to crytome, can cut ultrathin blocks of tissue, and that tissue can be observed by transmission electron microscopy. The cutting thickness of ultracryotome is about dozens of nanometers. The ultrastructural properties can be studied without embedding of the tissue, and so the molecular conservation is better.

== See also ==
- Frozen tissue array
