= Microtechnique =

Microtechnique is an aggregate of methods used to prepare micro-objects for studying. It is currently being employed in many fields in life science. Two well-known branches of microtechnique are botanical (plant) microtechnique and zoological (animal) microtechnique.

With respect to both plant microtechnique and animal microtechnique, four types of methods are commonly used, which are whole mounts, smears, squashes, and sections, in recent micro experiments. Plant microtechnique contains direct macroscopic examinations, freehand sections, clearing, maceration, embedding, and staining. Moreover, three preparation ways used in zoological micro observations are paraffin method, celloidin method, and freezing method.

== History ==
The early development of microtechnique in botany is closely related to that in zoology. Zoological and botanical discoveries are adopted by both zoologists and botanists.

The field of microtechnique lasted from at the end of the 1930s when the principle of dry preparation emerged. The early development of microtechnique in botany is closely related to that in zoology. Zoological and botanical discoveries are adopted by both zoologists and botanists. Since Hooke discovered cells, microtechnique had also developed with the emergence of early microscopes. Microtechnique then had advanced over the period of 1800–1875. After 1875, modern micro methods have emerged. In recent years, both traditional methods and modern microtechnique have been in use in many experiments.

== Commonly used methods ==
Some general microtechnique can be used in both plant and animal micro observation. Whole mounts, smears, squashes, and sections are four commonly used methods when preparing plant and animal specimens for specific purposes.

=== Whole mounts ===
Whole mounts are usually used when observers need to use a whole organism or do some detailed research on specific organ structure. This method requires objects in which moisture can be removed, like seeds and micro fossils.

According to different purposes, Whole-mounts can be divided into three categories, Temporary whole mounts, Semi-permanent whole mounts, and permanent whole mounts. Temporary whole mounts are usually used for teaching activities in class. Semi-permanent whole mounts are prepared for longer using time, which is no more than fourteen days. In this preparation, Canada balsam is used to seal the specimens, and this method is used to observe unicellular and colonial algae, fungal spores, mosses protonemata, and prothalli. The third way is a permanent whole mount. Two methods are usually used, which are hygrobutol method and glycerine-xylol method.

Smear from solid medium and liquid medium

=== Smears ===
Smears is an easy way for preparing slices. This method is used in many laboratories. Smears can be employed when making slide specimens by spreading liquid or semi-liquid materials or lose tissues and cells of animals and plants evenly on the slide. The steps and requirements for the application of the smear method are as follows: first, smear. When the solid material is smeared, the material should be placed on the glass slide and wiped away, then use the blade to press the material on one side. The cells should be pressed out and distributed evenly on the glass slide in a thin layer, such as the anther smeared.

=== Squashes ===
Squashes are methods, in which objects are crushed with force. This method is suitable for preparing both transparent and tender tissues. When preparing squashes slides, specimens are supposed to be thin and transparent so that objects can be observed clearly under microscopes.

This technique is to place the material on the glass slide and remove it with the scalpel or to dissect needle, then add a drop of dye solution. After these steps, apply the second slide to cover the initial slide and apply pressure evenly to break the material and disperse the cells. Furthermore, another possible way can be used to prepare slides. The specimens can also be extruded between the cover slide and the slide with equal pressure.

=== Sections ===
Sections are known as thin slices need to be tested in all studies of cellular structures. This technique can be used for the preparation of tissue of animals and plants. For using under optical microscopy, the thickness of the material should be between above 2 and 25 micrometers. When observing under electron microscopy, sections should be from 20 to 30 nanometers. Microtome can be used in sectioning of sufficiently thin slices. If the objects cannot satisfy the requirement of thickness, materials are required to be dehydrated using alcohol before section. Three commonly used sectioning method are freehand section technique, paraffin method, and celloidin method.

== Methods used in plant micro-experiments ==
Botanical microtechnique is an aggregate of methods providing micro visualization of gene and gene product in an entire plant. Plant microtechnique is also a study providing valuable experimental information. Plant microtechnique involves classical methods developed over a hundred years ago and new methods developed to expand our research scope and depth in botanical micro studies. Both traditional and new micro technique is useful for experimental research, and some will have a significant influence on further study. Different methods are used to prepare plant specimens, including direct macroscopic examinations, freehand sections, clearing, maceration, embedding, and staining.

=== Direct microscopic examinations ===
The direct micro examination is a simple way prepared for observing micro-objects. Also, this method is useful to observe whether the mold grows on the surface of the specimens. This can be an initial step of the micro experiment.

=== Freehand section ===
Freehand slicing is a method of making thin slices of fresh or fixed experimental materials with a hand-held blade. Freehand slicing refers to the method of directly cutting fresh or fixed materials (generally plants with a low degree of lignification) into thin slices without special instruments or special chemical reagents.

=== Clearing ===
Clearing technique provides translucent slides via removing part of cytoplasmic content and then applying high refractive index reagents to process the tissues. This method is suitable for preparing whole mount slides. The clearing is a procedure of using clearing reagents for removal of alcohol and makes tissue translucent. Xylene is the most popular clearing agent.

=== Maceration ===
Macerating tissues is the process of separating the constituent cells of tissues. This method enables observers to study the whole cell in third-dimensional detail. Chemical maceration method means the using chemicals to process organs or part to soften tissue and dissolving the cells so that different cell can be identified.

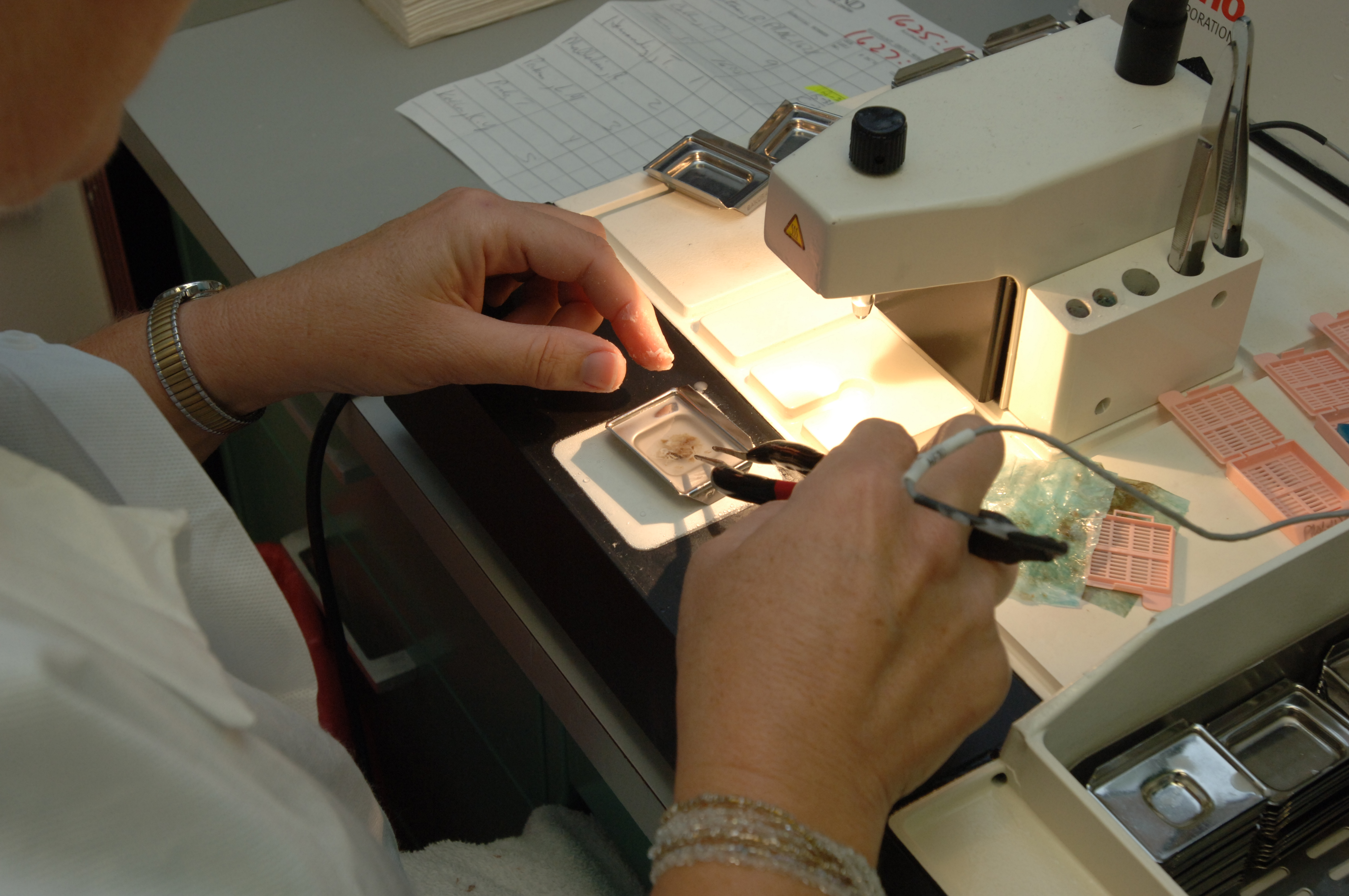
Tissue processing - Embedding station

=== Embedding ===
Embedding technique is a medium stage when doing a sectioning process. When preparing specimens, it is difficult to make uniform slices since the tissue is soft. Therefore, it is necessary to soak the tissue with a certain substance to harden the whole tissue, to facilitate the slicing. This process is called embedding. The substance used to embed tissue is embedding media, which is chosen depends on the category of the microscope, category of the micro tome, and category of tissue. Paraffin wax, whose melting point is from 56 to 62 °C, is commonly used for embedding.

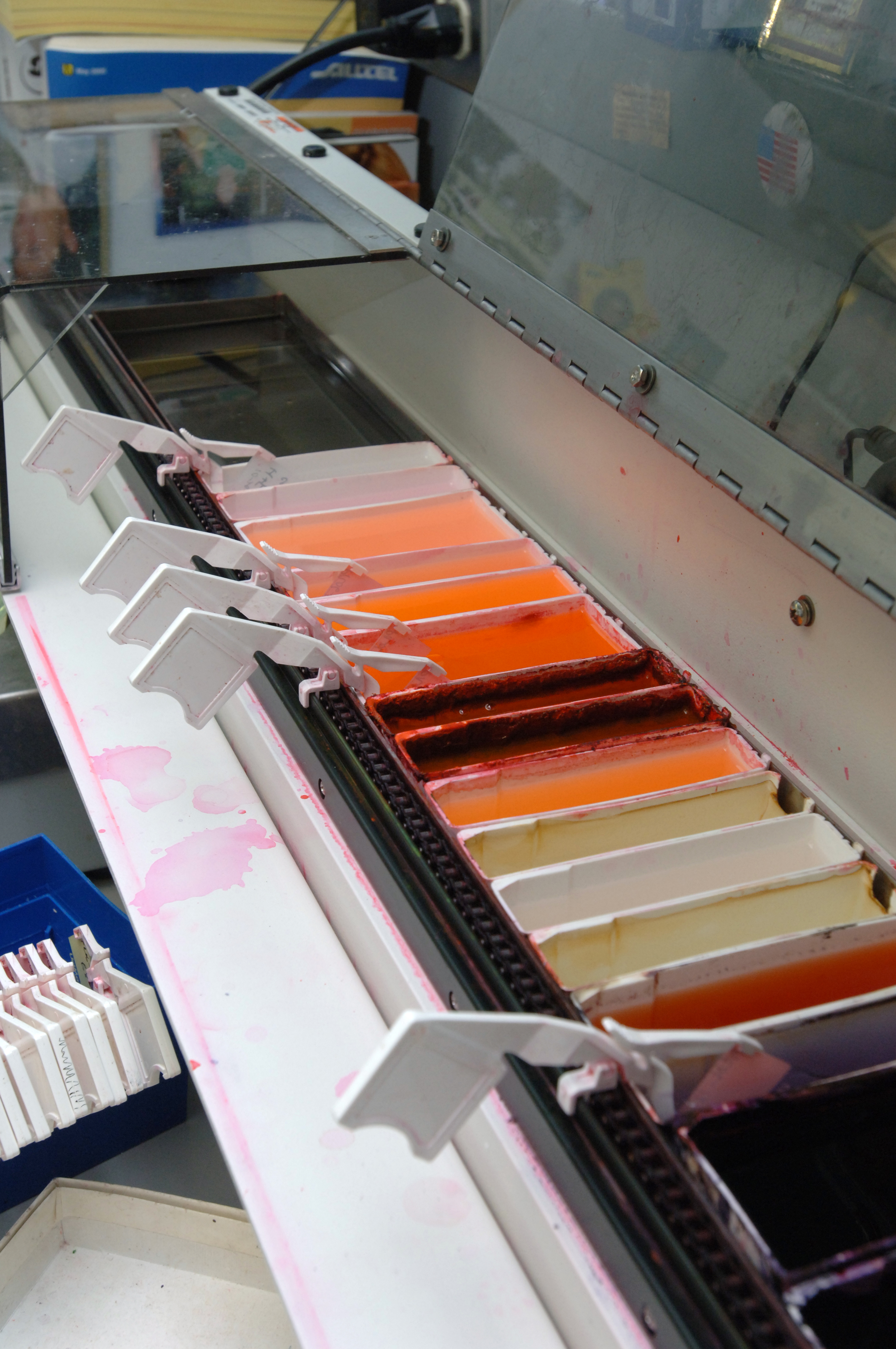
Tissue processing - Tissue sections on slides are stained on an automated stainer

=== Staining ===
Since few plant tissues have a color, there is little chromatically difference between plant tissues makes it difficult to differentiate botanical structure. Material is usually dyed before installation. This process is called staining, which can be used to prepare botanical specimens so that it is possible to distinguish one part of the sample from another in terms of color. Acid dyes can be used when staining micro slides, for example, acid dyes are in use when coloring nuclei and other cellular components are stained using alkaline. There are also staining machine used for staining, which allows tissue to be stained automatically.

== Microtechnique used for animal observation ==
The zoological microtechnique is the art of the preparation for microscopic animal observation. Although many microtechniques can be used in both plant and animal micro experiments. Some methods may differ from itself when employed in different field. Three commonly used preparation ways used in zoological micro observations can be concluded as paraffin method, celloidin method, freezing method, and miscellaneous techniques.

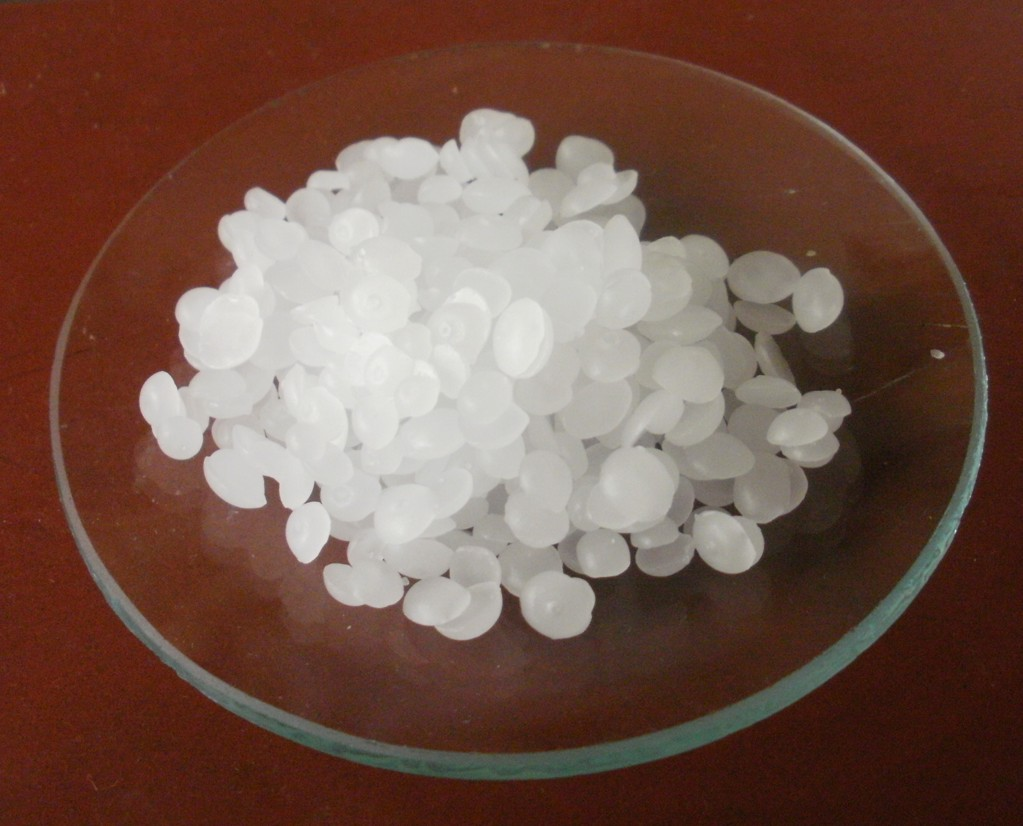
Paraffin wax

=== Paraffin method ===
==== Infiltration and embedding ====
This process usually consists of steps of infiltration, embedding, sectioning, affixing and processing the sections. Followed by the initial stage, fixation, the next step is dehydration, which removes the water in the tissue using alcohol. Then the tissue can be infiltrated and embedded with wax. A tissue specimen can keep for several years after finishing embedding this tissue into the wax. Paraffin wax, which is soft and colorless, is the most commonly used reagent.

Microtome-knife-profile

==== Sectioning ====
Sectioning a tissue can use either the micro tome knife or the razor blade as the cutting blade.

The micro tome knife is used for handling sectioning. It is necessary to use a micro tome knife when preparing sections less than 1/1000 micrometers. When using such a knife, the operators must be extremely careful. This instrument is impractical sometimes, so using the razor blade for general work to prepare sections above 9 microns (1 micron equals 1/1000 micrometers). Furthermore, the razor blade works better than the micro tome knife when requiring thick sections with no less than 20 microns.

==== Affixing and processing ====
After sectioning, the prepared slices are affixed on slides. There are two commonly used affixatives, Haupt's and Mayer's. Haupt's affixative contains 100 ccs (cubic centimeter) distilled water, 1gm gelatin, 2 gm phenol crystals, 15 cc glycerine. Mayer's affixative is consist of 5 cc egg albumen, 50 cc glycerine, 1 gm sodium salicylate. The general steps of affixing paraffin sections can be concluded as 1. Clean the required slides, 2. Mark the cleaned slides, 3. Drop affixative on each slide, 4. Put on another slide, 5. Spread the affixative, 6. Drop floating medium, 7. Divide the paraffin into required length, 8. Transfer the sections, 9. Add more floating medium if incomplete floating occurs, 10. Rise the temperature, 11. Remove slides and redundant floating medium, 12, drying the section.

Processing paraffin sections include 1. Deparaffination, 2. Removing the deparaffing solution, 3. Hydration, 4. Staining, 5. Dehydration, 6. Dealcoholisation and clearing, 7. Mounting the cover slide.

=== Celloidin method ===
Celloidin technique is the procedure of embedding a specimen in celloidin. This method can be used for embedding large, hard objects. Celloidin is a digestive fiber, which is flammable, and it is soluble in acetone, clove oil, and the mixture of anhydrous alcohol and ether. Celloidin will turn into white emulsion turbid liquid when it meets water, so it is required to use a dry container to contain celloidin.

The method of celloidin slicing is to fix and dehydrate the tissue, then treat it with the anhydrous alcohol-ether mixture. After this step, to impregnate, embed and slice the tissue with celloidin. Moreover, this slicing method can slice large tissues and has the advantage that its heat allows the tissues does not shrink. However, this technique contains some shortcomings. For instance, the slices cannot be sliced very thin (more than 20 microns), and impregnation with celloidin is time-consuming.

=== Freezing method ===
Freezing technique is the most commonly used sectioning method. This method can preserve the immune activity of various antigens well. Both fresh tissue and fixed tissue can be frozen. Moreover, it is also a technique used for freezing sections of either fresh or fixed plant tissues.

During the freezing procedure, the water in tissues is easy to form ice crystals, which often affects the antigen localization. It is generally believed that when ice crystals are small, the effect is small, and when ice crystals are large, the damage to the tissue structure is large, and the above phenomenon is more likely to occur in tissues with more moisture components. The size of an ice crystal is directly proportional to its growth rate and inversely proportional to the nucleation rate (formation rate), that is, the larger the number of ice crystal formation, the smaller it is, and the more serious the impact on the structure. Therefore, the number of ice crystals should be minimized. The freezing method allows sectioning tissues rapidly and biopsy without using reagents. This procedure should be rapidly in case of the form of ice crystal.

== See also ==
- Microtechnology
- Histology
