= National Society for Histotechnology =

The National Society for Histotechnology (NSH) is a professional association for clinical laboratory histotechnologists that was founded in 1973.
