= Optimal cutting temperature compound =

Process in medicine

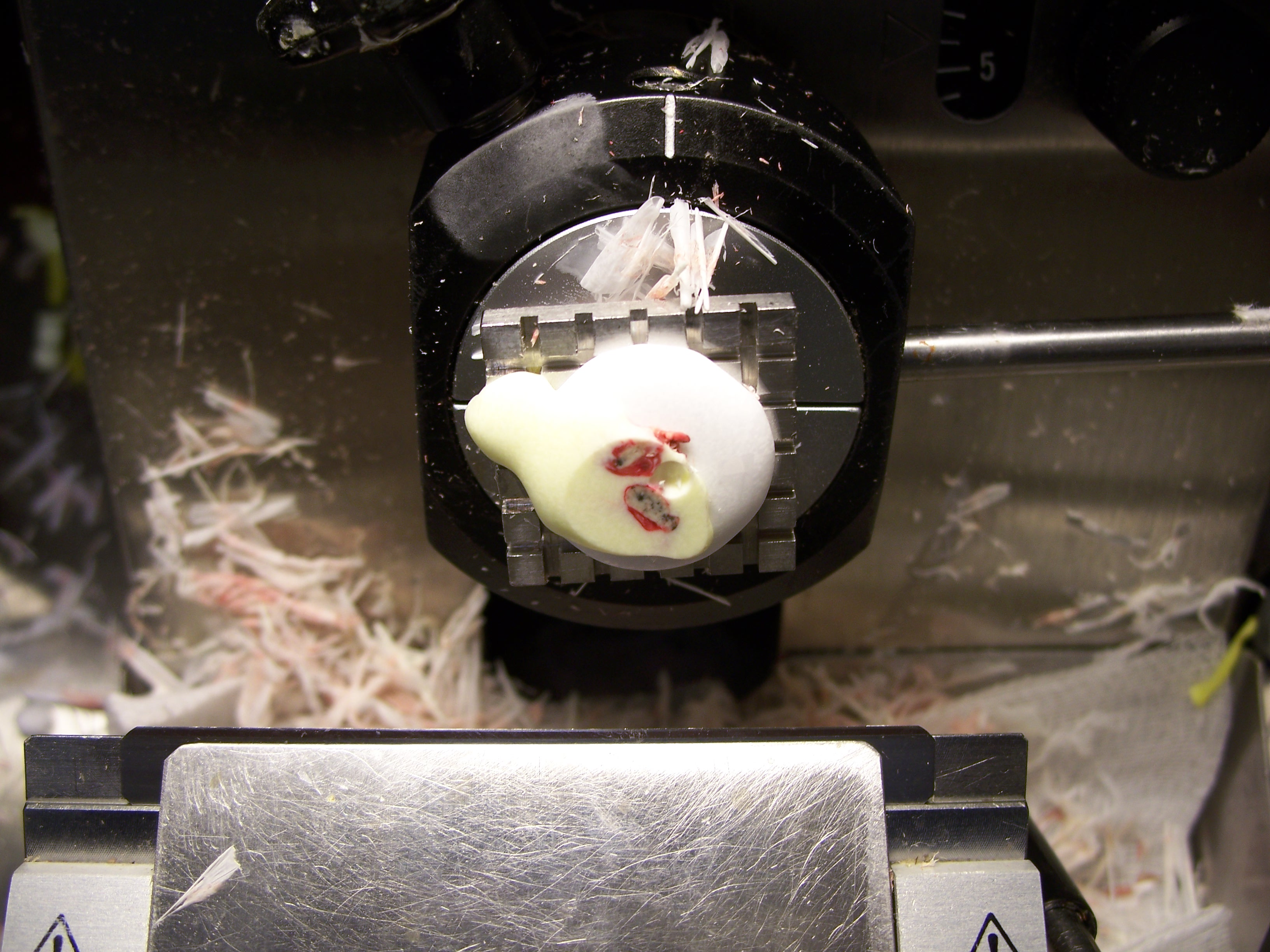
Frozen section procedure: tissue embedded in optimal cutting temperature compound, mounted on a chuck in a cryostat and ready for section production

Optimal cutting temperature (OCT) compound is used to embed tissue samples prior to frozen sectioning on a microtome-cryostat. This process is undertaken so as to mount slices (sections) of a sample onto slides for analysis.

== Components ==
From MSDS:

- 5–15% polyvinyl alcohol
- 1–10% polyethylene glycol
- 75–95% non-reactive ingredients

== See also ==
- Microtome
- Cryostat
