= Lambda point refrigerator =

Scientific refrigeration apparatus

A lambda point refrigerator is a device used to cool liquid helium, typically around a superconducting magnet or for low temperature measurements, from approximately 4.2 K to temperatures near the lambda point of helium (approximately 2.17 K), the temperature at which normal fluid helium (helium I) transitions to the superfluid helium II. Cooling is achieved by pumping the liquid helium in the bath through a cooling coil via a needle valve and vacuum pump. The reduced pressure in the coil causes some of the helium to evaporate, creating a two-phase system within the cooling coil. The heat removed via evaporation lowers the temperature of the cooling coil closer to the lambda point. Since the cooling coil is immersed in the liquid helium bath, liquid surrounding the coil is also cooled. The colder, higher density liquid sinks away from the coil toward the bottom of the bath while the warmer, lower density liquid helium rises to the top. Liquid helium typically has poor thermal conductivity, so convective currents associated with a temperature gradient in the bath provide a constant flow of this colder liquid helium toward the bottom of the bath, allowing temperatures below 4.2 K to be realized in the helium bath, typically close to 2.2 K.
