= Cryostat =

Cooling device

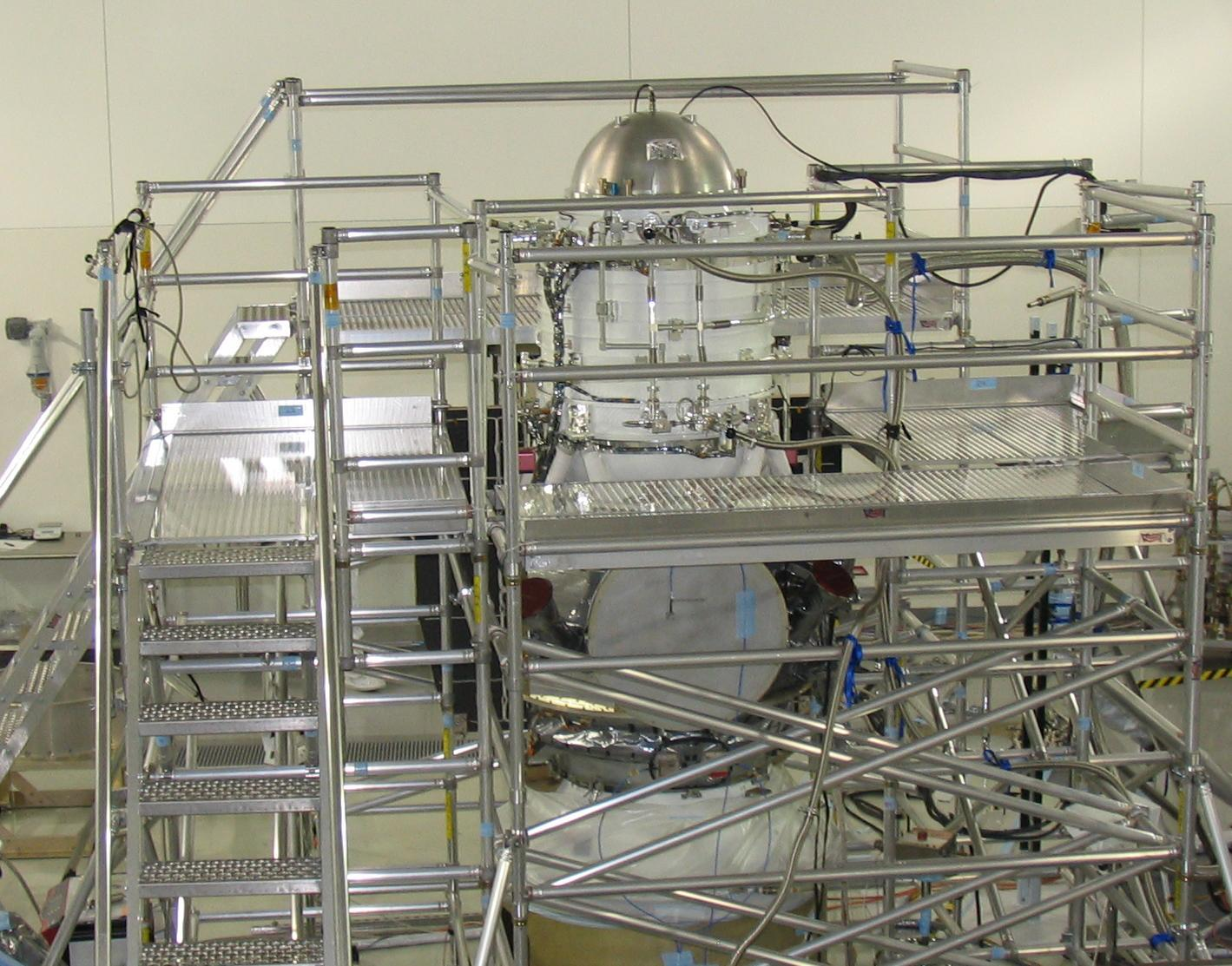
NASA's WISE infrared instrument is kept cold by a cryostat. The cryostat can be seen at the top of the spacecraft.

A cryostat (from cryo meaning cold and stat meaning stable) is a device used to maintain low cryogenic temperatures of samples or devices mounted within the cryostat. Low temperatures may be maintained within a cryostat by using various refrigeration methods, most commonly using cryogenic fluid bath such as liquid helium. Hence it is usually assembled into a vessel, similar in construction to a vacuum flask or Dewar. Cryostats have numerous applications within science, engineering, and medicine.

== Types ==
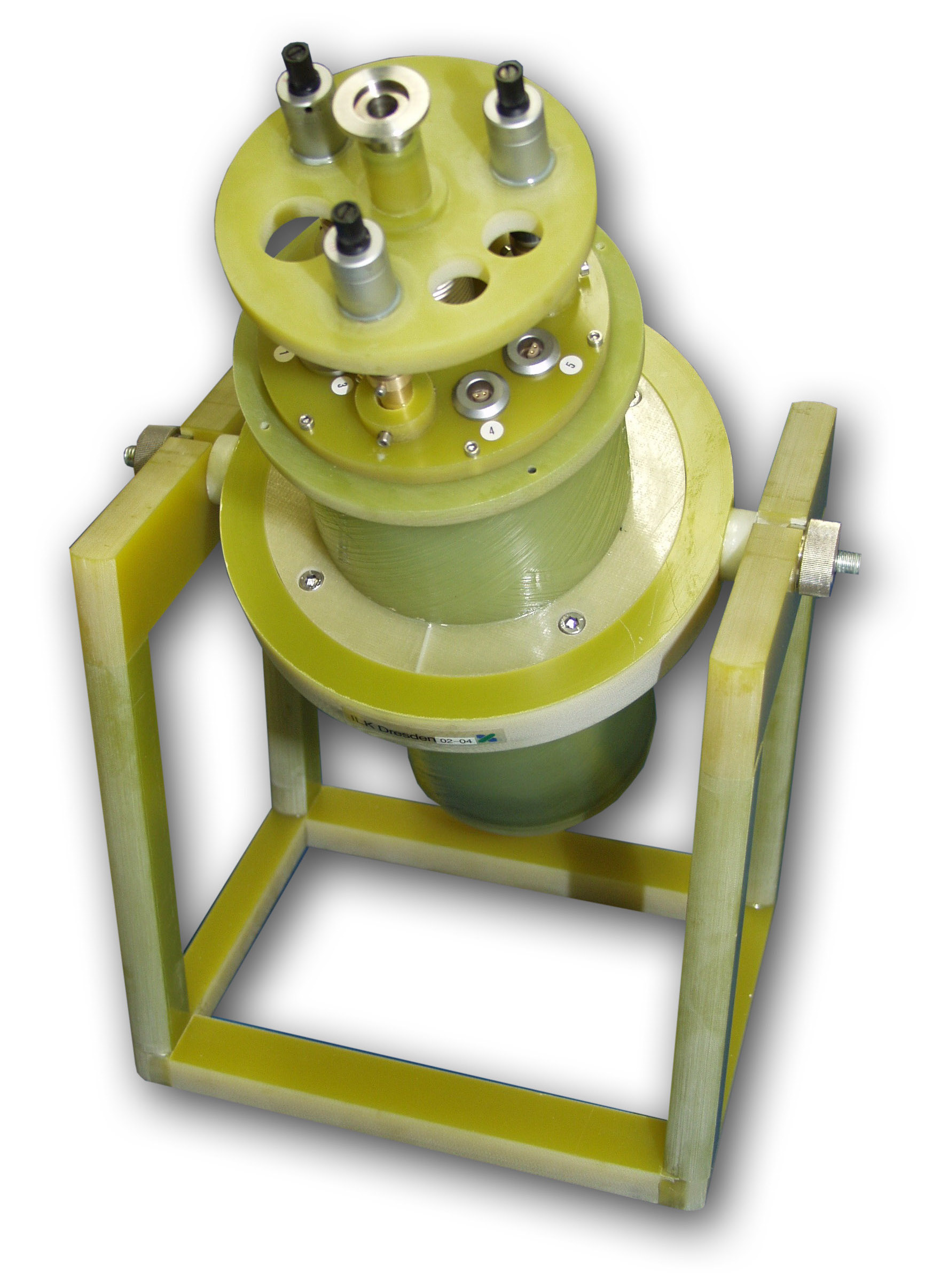
A non-metallic, tiltable bath cryostat for liquid nitrogen

=== Closed-cycle cryostats ===
Closed-cycle cryostats consist of a chamber through which cold helium vapour is pumped. An external mechanical refrigerator extracts the warmer helium exhaust vapour, which is cooled and recycled. Closed-cycle cryostats consume a relatively large amount of electrical power, do not need to be refilled with helium, and can run continuously for an indefinite period. Objects may be cooled by attaching them to a metallic cold plate inside a vacuum chamber which is in thermal contact with the helium vapour chamber.

=== Continuous-flow cryostats ===
Continuous-flow cryostats are cooled by liquid cryogens (typically liquid helium or nitrogen) from a storage dewar. As the cryogen boils within the cryostat, it is continuously replenished by a steady flow from the storage dewar. Temperature control of the sample within the cryostat is typically performed by controlling the flow rate of cryogen into the cryostat together with a heating wire attached to a PID temperature control loop. The length of time over which cooling may be maintained is dictated by the volume of cryogens available.

Owing to the scarcity of liquid helium, some laboratories have facilities to capture and recover helium as it escapes from the cryostat, although these facilities are also costly to operate.

=== Bath cryostats ===
Bath cryostats are similar in construction to vacuum flasks filled with liquid helium. A cold plate is placed in thermal contact with the liquid helium bath. The liquid helium may be replenished as it boils away, at intervals between a few hours and several months, depending on the volume and construction of the cryostat. The boil-off rate is minimised by shielding the bath with either cold helium vapour, or vacuum shield with walls constructed from super insulator material. The helium vapour which boils away from the bath very effectively cools thermal shields around the outside of the bath. In the older designs there may be additional liquid nitrogen bath, or several concentric layers of shielding, with gradually increasing temperatures. However, the invention of super insulator materials has made this technology obsolete.

=== Multistage cryostats ===
In order to achieve temperatures lower than liquid helium at atmospheric pressure, additional cooler stages may be added to the cryostat. Temperatures down to 1 K can be reached by attaching the cold plate to a 1-K pot, which is a container of the He-4 isotope that may be pumped to low vapor pressure via a vacuum pump. Temperatures just below 0.300 K may be achieved using He-3, the rare isotope of helium, as the working fluid in a helium pot. Temperatures down to 1 mK can be reached by employing dilution refrigerator or dry dilution refrigerator typically in addition to the main stage and 1 K pot. Temperatures below that can be reached using magnetic refrigeration.

== Applications ==
=== Magnetic resonance imaging and research magnet types ===
Cryostats used in MRI machines are designed to hold a cryogen, typically helium, in a liquid state with minimal evaporation (boil-off). The liquid helium bath is designed to keep the superconducting magnet's bobbin of superconductive wire in its superconductive state. In this state, the wire has no electrical resistance and very large currents are maintained with low power input. To maintain superconductivity, the bobbin must be kept below its transition temperature by being immersed in the liquid helium. If, for any reason, the wire becomes resistive, i.e. loses superconductivity, a condition known as a "quench", the liquid helium evaporates, instantly raising pressure within the vessel. A burst disk, usually made of carbon, is placed within the chimney or vent pipe so that during a pressure excursion, the gaseous helium can be safely vented out of the MRI suite. Modern MRI cryostats use a mechanical refrigerator (cryocooler) to re-condense the helium gas and return it to the bath, to maintain cryogenic conditions and to conserve helium.

Typically cryostats are manufactured with two vessels, one inside the other. The outer vessel is evacuated with the vacuum acting as a thermal insulator. The inner vessel contains the cryogen and is supported within the outer vessel by structures made from low-conductivity materials. An intermediate shield between the outer and inner vessels intercepts the heat radiated from the outer vessel. This heat is removed by a cryocooler. Older helium cryostats used a liquid nitrogen vessel as this radiation shield and had the liquid helium in an inner, third, vessel. Nowadays few units using multiple cryogens are made with the trend being towards 'cryogen-free' cryostats in which all heat loads are removed by cryocoolers.

=== Biological microtome type ===
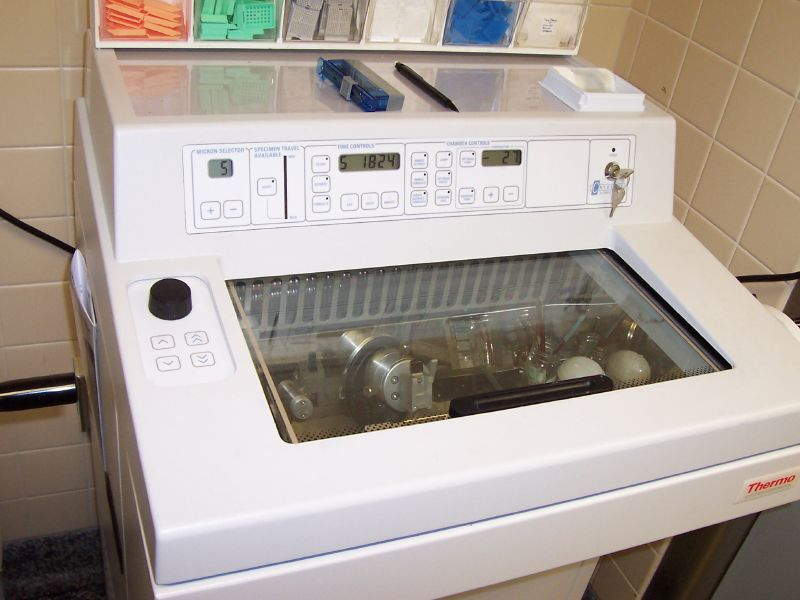
Cryostat-microtome

Cryostats are used in medicine to cut histological slides. They are usually used in a process called frozen section histology (see Frozen section procedure). The cryostat is essentially an ultrafine "deli-slicer", called a microtome, placed in a freezer. The cryostat is usually a stationary upright freezer, with an external wheel for rotating the microtome. The temperature can be varied, depending on the tissue being cut usually from −20 °C to −30 °C. The freezer is either powered by electricity, or by a refrigerant like liquid nitrogen. Small portable cryostats are available and can run off generators or vehicle inverters. To minimize unnecessary warming all necessary mechanical movements of the microtome can be achieved by hand via a wheel mounted outside the chamber. Newer microtomes have electric push button advancement of the tissue. The precision of the cutting is in micrometres. Tissue are sectioned as thin as 1 micrometre. Usual histology slides are mounted with a thickness of about 7 micrometres. Specimens that are soft at room temperature are mounted on a cutting medium (often made of egg white) on a metal "chuck", and frozen to cutting temperature (for example at −20 °C). Once frozen, the specimen on the chuck is mounted on the microtome. The crank is rotated and the specimen advances toward the cutting blade. Once the specimen is cut to a satisfactory quality, it is mounted on a warm (room temperature) clear glass slide, where it will instantaneously melt and adhere. The glass slide and specimen is dried with a dryer or air dried, and stained. The entire process from mounting to reading the slide takes from 10 to 20 minutes, allowing rapid diagnosis in the operating room, for the surgical excision of cancer. The cryostat can be used to cut histology and tissue slide (e.g., for enzyme localization) outside of medicine, but the quality of the section is poor compared to standard fixed section wax mounted histology.

== See also ==
- Lambda point refrigerator
