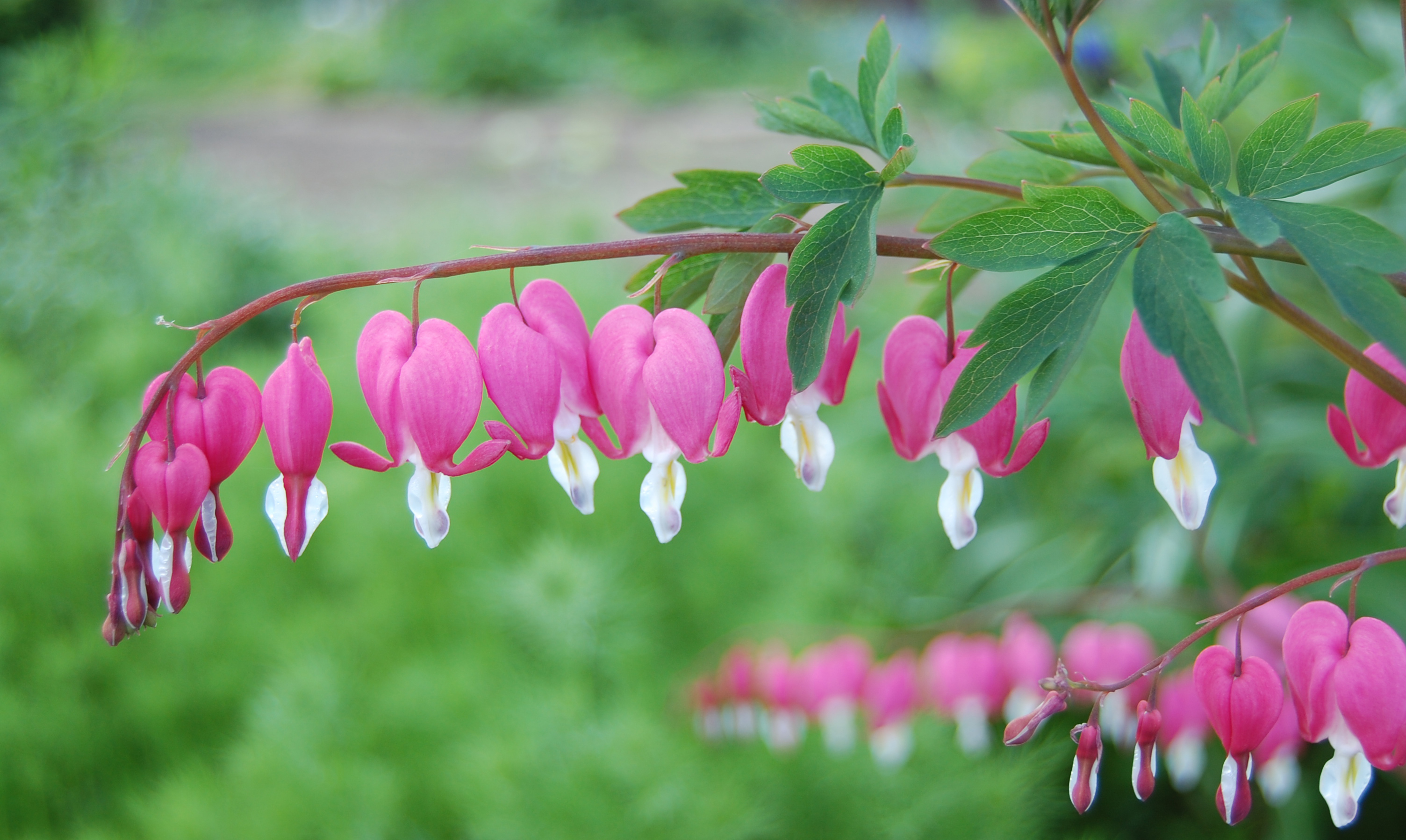

Scientific classification
- Kingdom: Plantae
- Clade: Tracheophytes
- Clade: Angiosperms
- Clade: Eudicots
- Order: Ranunculales
- Family: Papaveraceae
- Tribe: Fumarieae
- Subtribe: Corydalinae
- Genus: Lamprocapnos; Endl.
- Species: L. spectabilis

Binomial name
- Lamprocapnos spectabilis (L.) Fukuhara

Synonyms
- Dicentra spectabilis (L.) Lem. Dielytra spectabilis (L.) DC. Fumaria spectabilis L.

= Lamprocapnos =

Genus of flowering plants in the poppy family

Lamprocapnos spectabilis, commonly known as bleeding heart or Asian bleeding heart, is a species of flowering plant belonging to the fumitory subfamily (Fumarioideae) of the Papaveraceae (poppy family). It is native to Northeast China and the Korean Peninsula; however, it has been introduced by humans into a larger area of Northeast Asia, including parts of Siberia, Russia and Japan.

It is the sole species in the monotypic genus Lamprocapnos, but is still widely sold under the obsolete name Dicentra spectabilis (now listed as a synonym), not to be confused with the North American native bleeding heart plants of the genus Dicentra. It is valued in flower gardens for the heart-shaped pink and white flowers it produces in spring.

== Etymology ==
The scientific name, Lamprocapnos spectabilis, can be broken up and translated: The Greek term "Lampro-" translates to words such as "bright", "shining", "sparkling", "dazzling", "brilliant", or "glistening", while the Greek term "-capnos" translates to "smoke". The Greek term "spectabilis" translates to words such as "spectacular", "showy", "remarkable", or "worth seeing". The literal translation means "Spectacular sparkling smoke".

=== Common names ===
Other common names include lyre flower, heart flower, and lady-in-a-bath.

In China, the plant has the common name of 荷包牡丹 (hébāo mǔdān) meaning "Purse peony", in reference to the resemblance of the individual flowers to an (upside down) hébāo ("propitious pouch" - a type of traditional Chinese "good luck" purse) and of the foliage to that of tree peonies (mǔdān/moutan).

The Korean common name for the plant, 금낭화 (geum nang hwa) or "Gold bag flower", makes the same comparison between the shape of the flower and that of an old-fashioned drawstring purse as does the Chinese.

Japanese common names for the plant include ケマンソウ (kemansō, derived from the Japanese common name for Corydalis, which is keman) and タイツリソウ (taitsurisō or "Sea bream fishing rod") given in recognition of the similarity in appearance of the inflorescence to a number of little fish (specifically the much-loved Japanese food fish, tai, also known as madai) hanging by their tails from a rod, while clasping yet smaller fish in their jaws.

Both the Chinese and Korean purse and the Japanese sea bream referenced in names for Lamprocapnos are not only considered auspicious, but also associated specifically with the New Year celebrations of their respective countries.

== Description ==
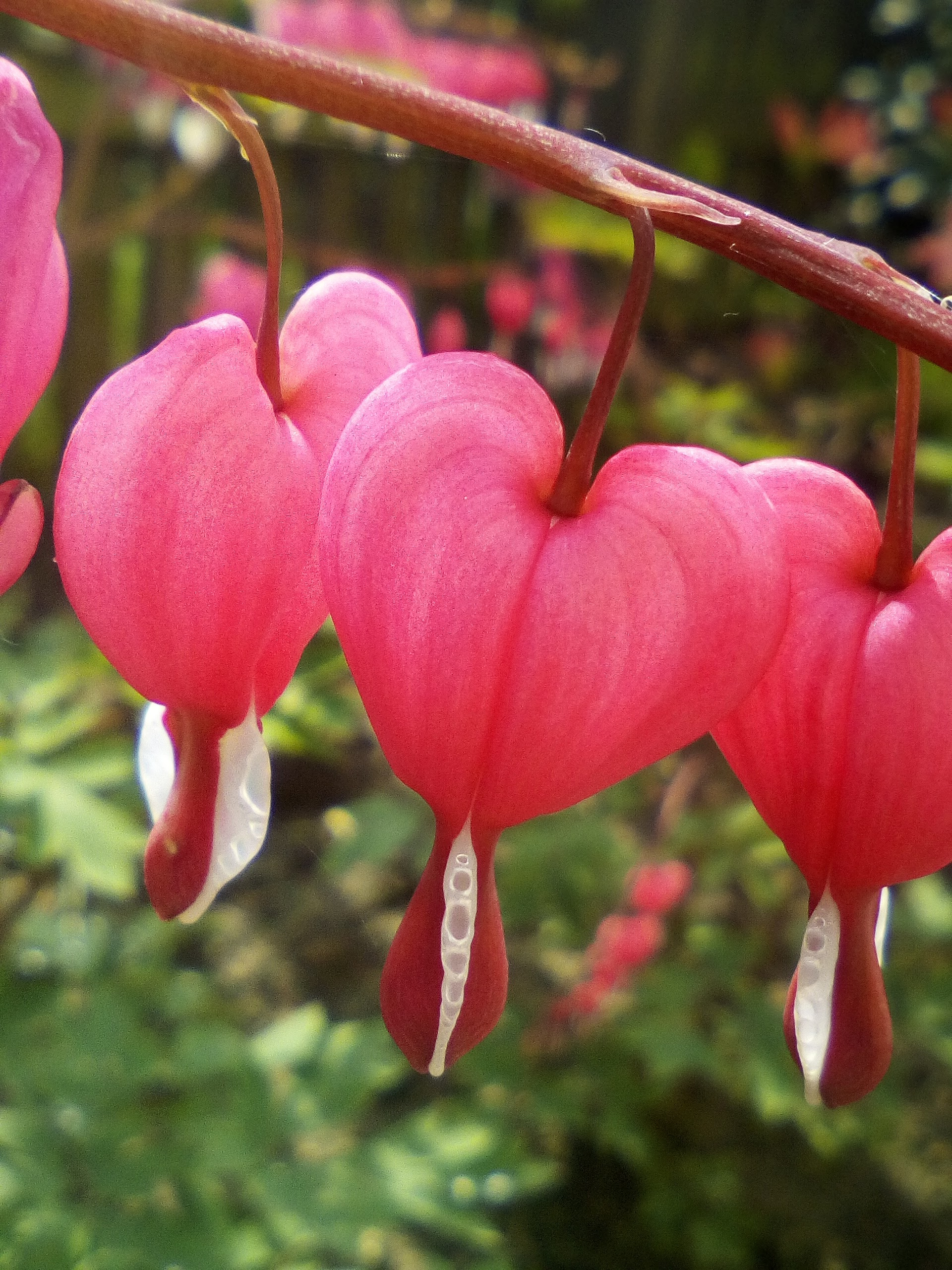
Flower buds

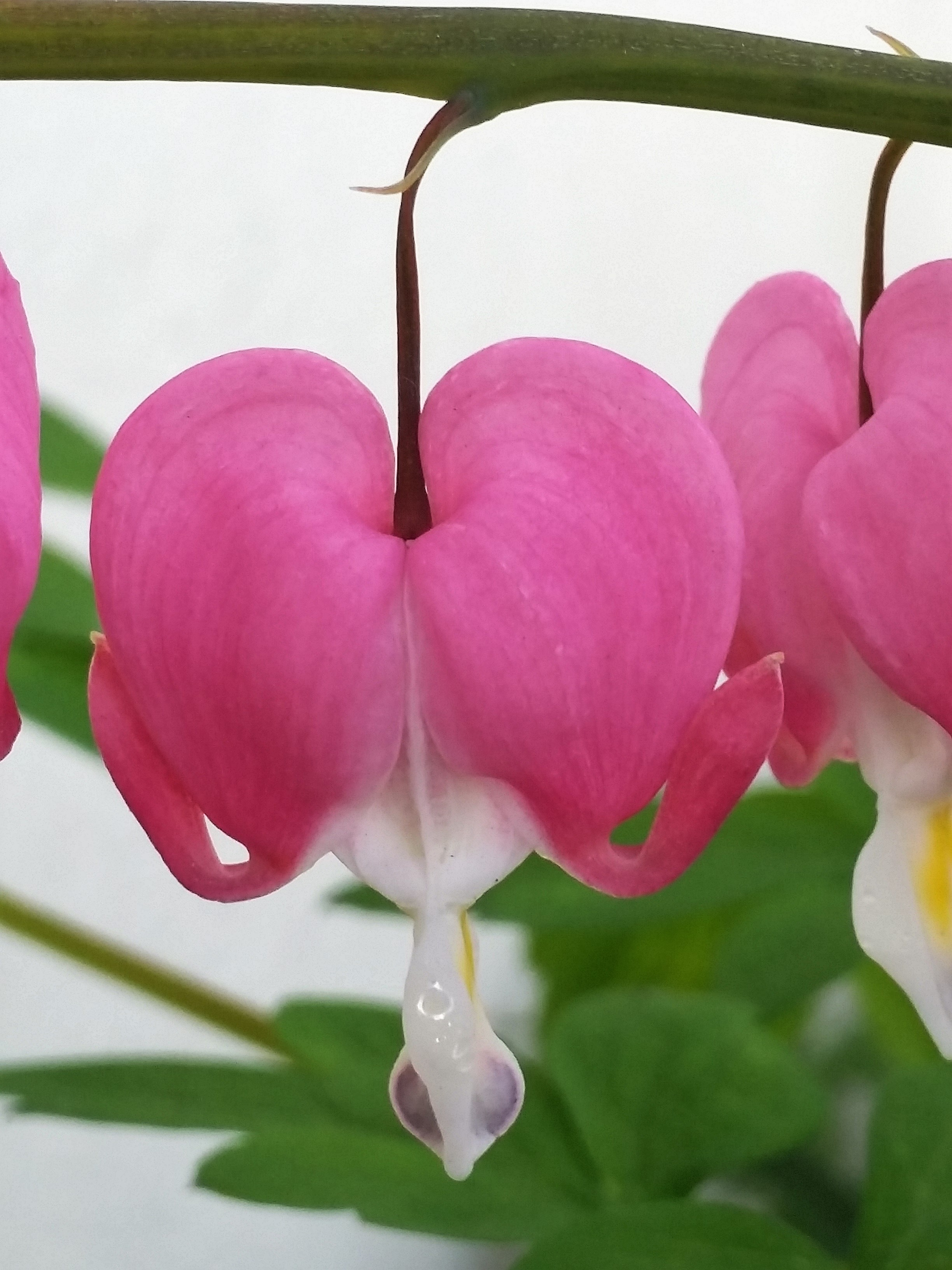
Single, mature flower showing reflexed appendages of outer, pink petals revealing inner, white teardrop

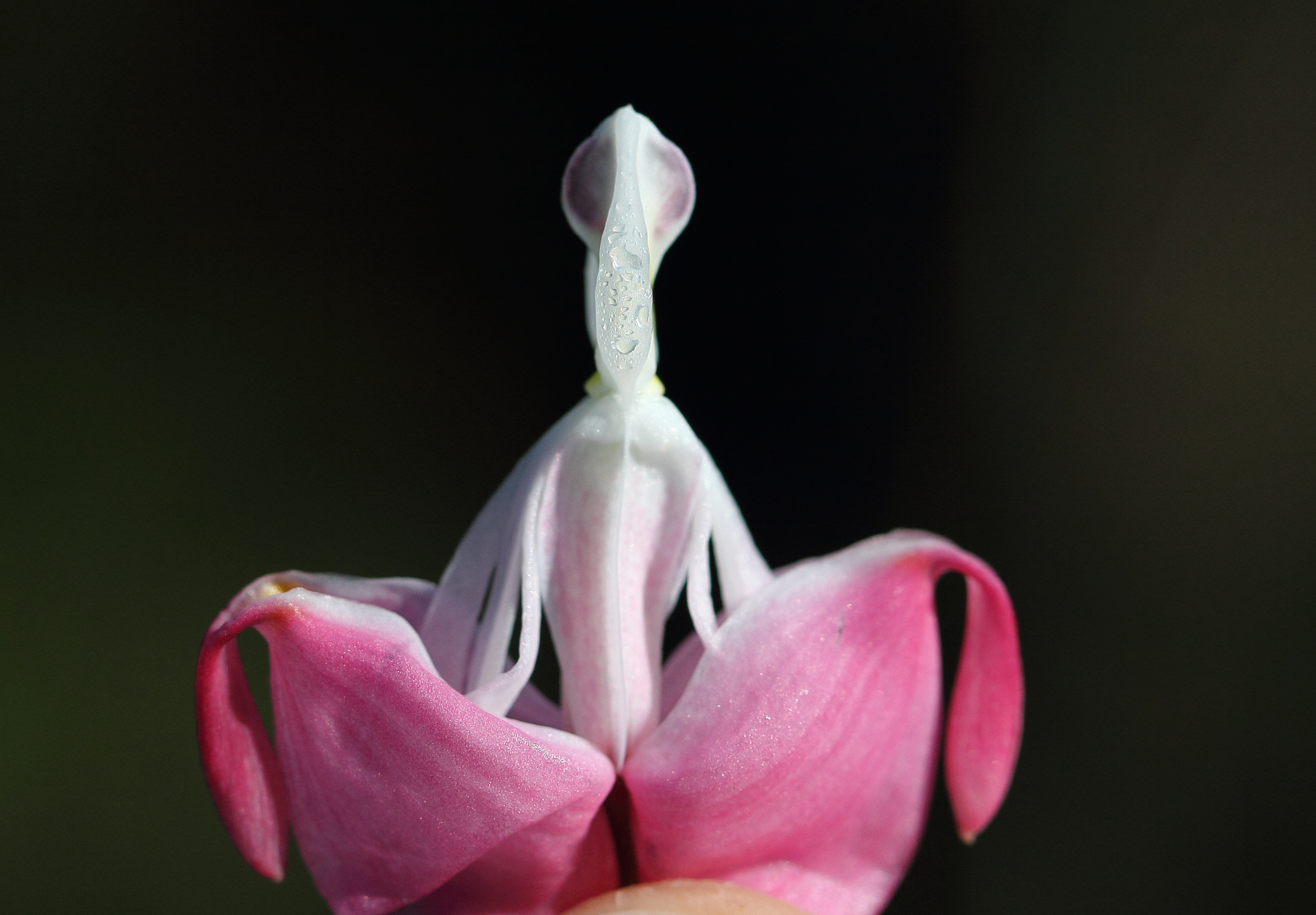
The two inner petals are made visible when the two pink outer petals are pulled apart. Their shape inspired the common name "lady-in-a-bath" and the more pious "Our Lady in a boat".

The Asian bleeding-heart grows to 120 cm (47 in) tall and 45 cm (18 in) wide. It is a rhizomatous herbaceous perennial with 3-lobed compound leaves on fleshy green to pink stems. The arching horizontal racemes of up to 20 pendent flowers are borne in spring and early summer. The outer petals are bright fuchsia-pink, while the inner ones are white. The flowers strikingly resemble the conventional heart shape, with a droplet beneath – hence the common name.

The plant sometimes behaves as a spring ephemeral, becoming dormant in summer.^{[3]}

== Habitat ==
In Korea, L. spectabilis behaves as a shade-loving chasmophyte, growing in rock crevices at low altitudes in the mountains of the central and southern parts of the country.

== Distribution ==
Lamprocapnos spectabilis is native to Northeast Asia, specifically Northeast China (provinces of Liaoning, Jilin and Heilongjiang) and the Korean Peninsula; however, L. spectabilis has been cultivated as an ornamental species for so long in this region that it has become hard to determine exactly which regions it is native and in which it is introduced.

== History ==
It is one of those plants of which the Chinese Mandarins in the north of China are so fond and which they cultivate with so much pride in their little fairy gardens.

Robert Fortune
personal communication May 20, 1847
Journal of the Royal Horticultural Society

The plant was first introduced to England from Asia in the year 1810 and was lost, but was subsequently reintroduced in 1846 by the Scottish botanist and plant hunter Robert Fortune, who sent specimens to the RHS, having found the plant already in cultivation "in the Grotto Garden on the Island of Chusan, growing among artificial rocks near the beautiful Weigela rosea".

== Cultivation ==
In a moist and cool climate, it will grow in full sun, but in warmer and drier climates it requires some shade.

Aphids, slugs and snails sometimes feed on the leaves.

Clumps remain compact for many years and do not need dividing. They have brittle roots which are easily damaged when disturbed. Root cuttings should be taken in spring.

Seeds with whitish elaiosomes are borne in long pods. They must be sown while fresh. Division should be done in the late fall (autumn) or early spring.

=== Cultivars ===
The following cultivars have gained the Royal Horticultural Society's Award of Garden Merit:

- Lamprocapnos spectabilis (pink and white flowered)
- 'Alba' (all white flowered)
- "Valentine" ('Hordival') (red and white flowered)

The cultivar 'Gold Heart', introduced from Hadspen Garden, England, in 1997, has yellow leaves.

== In Chinese culture and traditional medicine ==
玲珑奇巧涎欲滴，Delicate and quaint, with pendent drop of yearning unashamed
色彩绚丽若紫云；Bright as rosy clouds of eventide.
传言古时洛阳镇，'Tis said that, long ago, near ancient Luoyang town,
镇上玉女慧且纯；There dwelt a jade-bright maiden, wise and pure,
无奈情郎充军去，Whose secret love was called away to war,
只得寄情绣包存；Each month a wondrous purse embroidered she to hang upon the bough,
荷包香美已成串，Drawstring pulled tight upon sweet fragrance pent within.
可惜思君不见君。Pity the girl who pictured daily thus her pining heart.

王文英 (Wáng Wényīng)
Poems of a Hundred Flowers: number 70 - Purse Peony

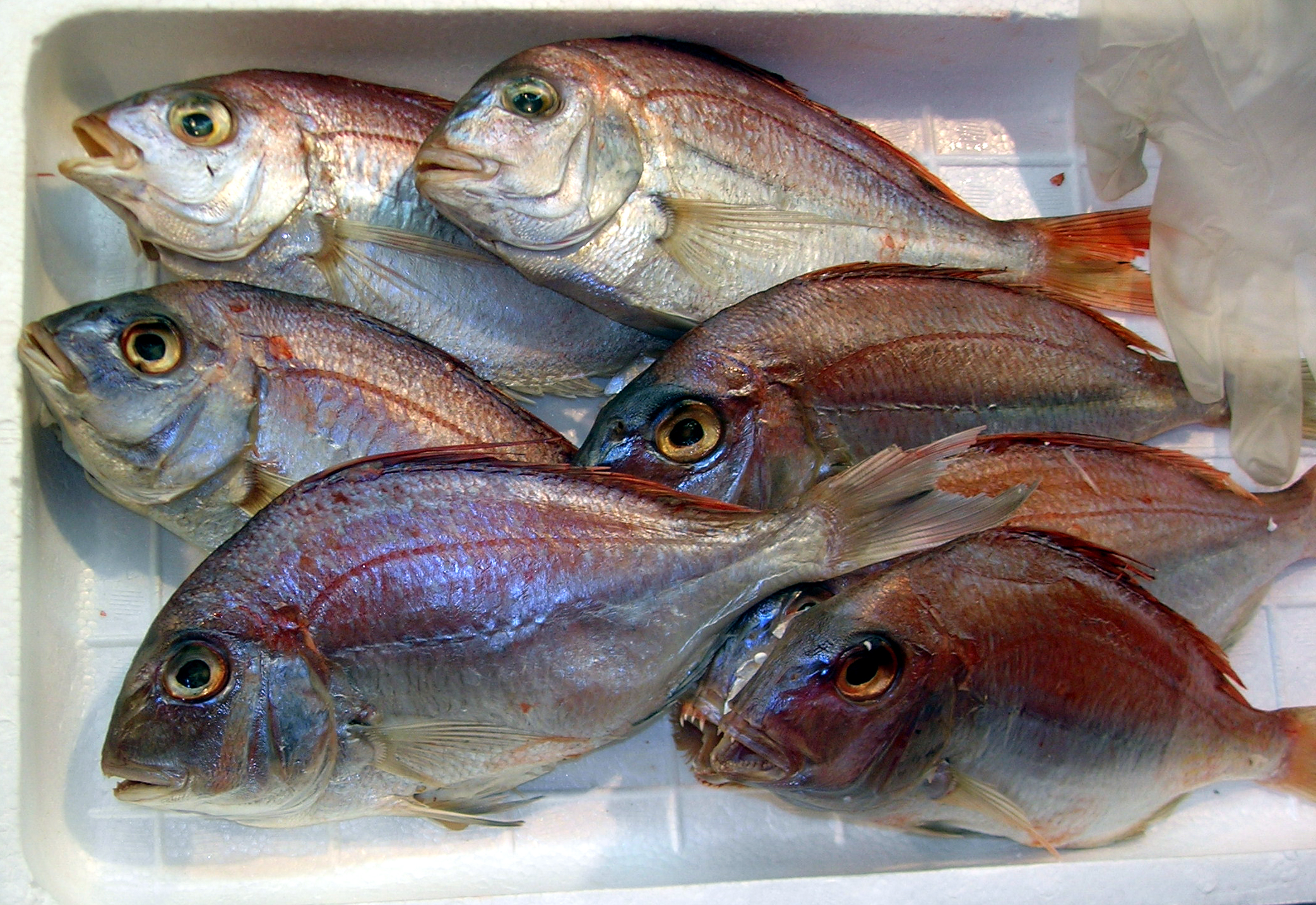
An array of tai (red seabream), whose roughly heart-shaped outline and pinkish colouration are referenced in the popular Japanese common name taitsurisō for Lamprocapnos (flowers)

=== Jade Maiden Si Jun and the "Purse Peony" ===
The short poem by modern Chinese poet Wáng Wényīng presented above alludes to a traditional tale concerning the etiology of the "purse peony". The goddess/fairy name Yunü employed in line four refers specifically to 玉女思君 (Yùnǚ sī jūn) Jade Maiden Si Jun, a literary inflection of a character originally a minor deity, although the name Yunü here designates, in a familiar trope, a virtuous and faithful young woman. The name 思君 (sī jūn) translates as "thinks-of-her-lord", reflecting the behaviour of the young woman in the legend.

The legend of Si Jun relates that in ancient times, some 200 miles to the southeast of Luoyang City in the province of Henan, there was a prefecture called Rǔzhōu, in the West of which lay Miaoxia, a small town in a valley bordered in by mountains. Here there lived Si Jun, a girl who was besieged by legions of eager suitors, whom she rebuffed, because she had a secret love. This secret love had enlisted as a soldier and had been encamped far away beyond Wànlǐ Chángchéng (the "Ten-Thousand Mile Long Wall") for two years, forbidden to communicate with Si Jun. Despite the fact that he could not reply to the letters that she sent him or receive her gifts, she waited for his return, easing her yearning for him by embroidering once a month a purse dedicated to him and hanging it upon a branch of the tree peony that grew outside her window. Her talent for embroidery caused the beautiful flowers that she created so skillfully with her needle to fool butterflies and bees, who would try to pollinate them, believing them to be real. This state of affairs continued for so long that the peony bush, though not actually in flower, appeared to have burst forth in strange, purse-shaped blooms, so many were the little embroidered pouches that Si Jun had created in honour of her absent lover. At last the immortals rewarded her patience by transmuting the purse-decked peony into a new kind of plant with foliage like that of a peony but with flowers shaped like bridal purses - the hébāo mǔdān (purse peony). To this very day a gift of purse peonies is considered in China the quintessential love token or proposal of marriage in the language of flowers, with much the same connotations as the red rose in Europe.

=== Traditional Chinese medicine ===
In Traditional Chinese medicine the root is employed for detoxification, to improve blood circulation, and as an analgesic. It is recorded in the "Lingnan Medicine Collection" (1949) that Lamprocapnos root can disperse blood, eliminate sores, eliminate "wind" (风; fēng), and "harmonize the blood". The medicinal qualities are described as pungent, bitter and warm, and are believed to replenish jing in the liver. Oral administration is used to treat sores and abdominal pain, while topical application is used to treat bruises and swellings. Caution is, however urged regarding overdose: the juice of the plant can cause tingling paresthesias after contact with exposed skin and oral overdose can give rise to vomiting, diarrhea and, in serious cases of poisoning, even respiratory failure, and cardiac paralysis.

== Toxicity ==
Contact with the plant can cause skin irritation in certain individuals, due to its containing isoquinoline alkaloids, including protopine, while consumption of the leaves can give rise to neurological symptoms, including confusion and irritability.

=== Case of accidental poisoning in Korea ===
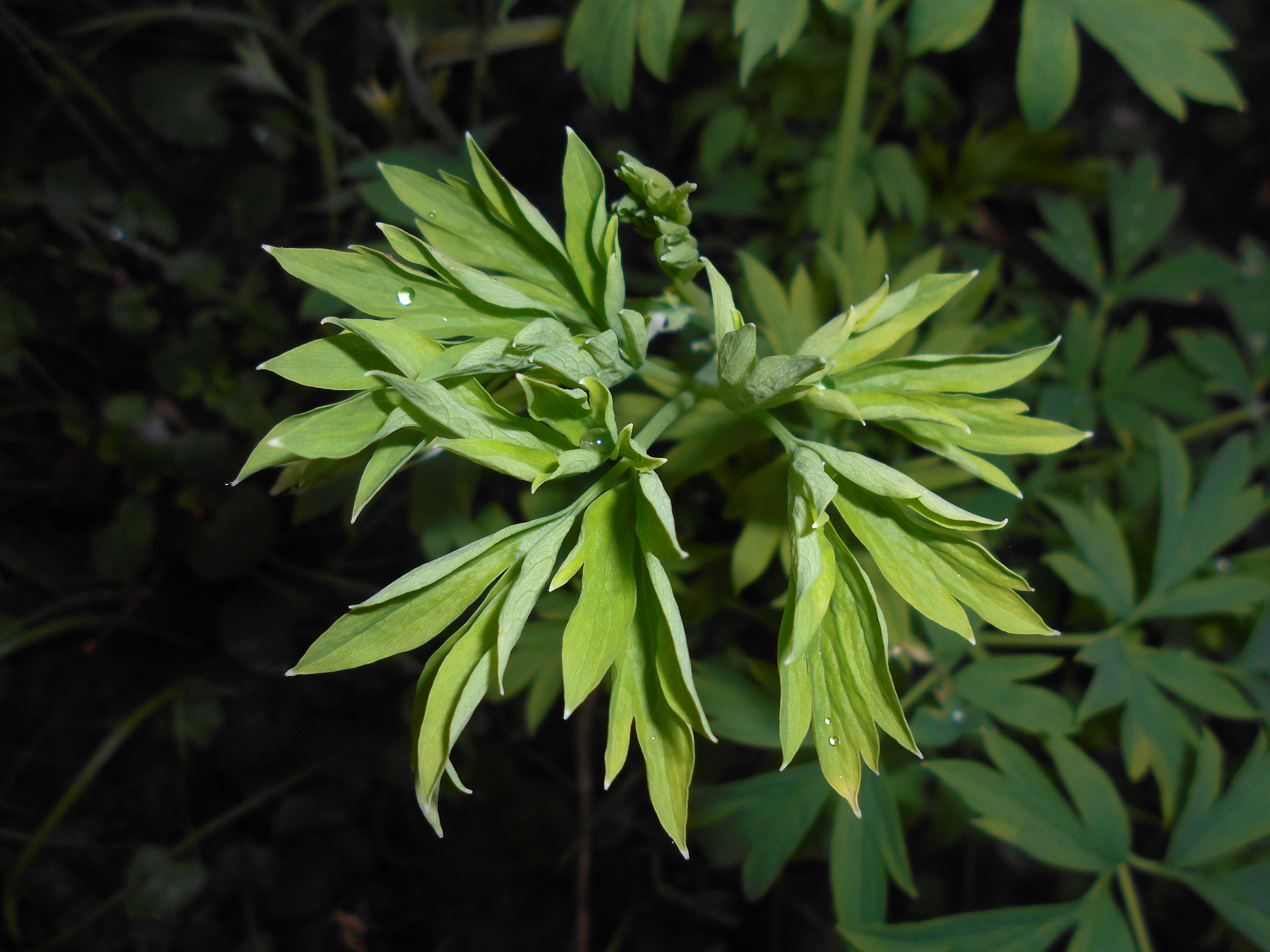
Young foliage of L. spectabilis

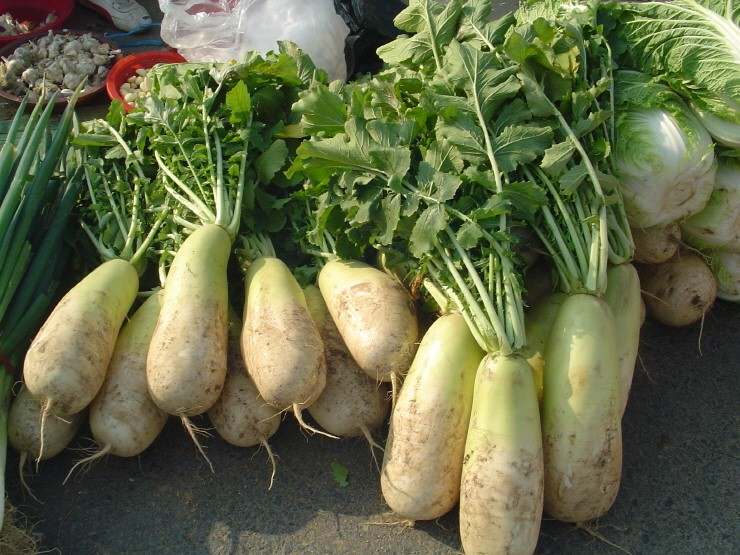
Korean radishes, showing tufts of foliage which can be confused with that of L. spectabilis

Jeong et al. reported a case of (non-fatal) poisoning in Korea in 2015: a party of four dining out at a local restaurant suffered symptoms of varying severity after consuming a dish of crucian carp and Korean radish greens to which a (possibly) careless or inexperienced chef had added leaves of L. spectabilis, which he may have mistaken for radish leaves, while gathering pot-herbs to cook with the fish. They note that the severity of poisoning could be correlated with the amount of the poisoned dish consumed; the only individual with symptoms requiring hospitalisation being a middle-aged man, already in poor health, who had eaten the most. All those poisoned complained of lethargy, dizziness, palpitation, and dry mouth half an hour after consuming the meal.

The authors conclude that the clinical manifestations in this poisoning case suggest anticholinergic syndrome and speculate that the mental changes in the victims were attributable to the effects on the CNS of the alkaloids scoulerine (which can act as a GABAA receptor agonist) and corydine which can evoke narcotic effects. They note also that the neurologic effects of the alkaloid protopine are qualitatively comparable to those of the well-known delirient tropane alkaloid atropine.

The 45-year-old male admitted to A&E suffering from Lamprocapnos poisoning had a history of hypertension and chronic kidney disease and presented with a confused mental state, elevated blood pressure, tachycardia, mild fever, dry mouth and facial flushing. Neurological examination revealed his confusion to be intermittent and associated with irritability, and an inability to comprehend and obey commands. His motor function, however was normal and he showed no abnormal reflexes. Furthermore, his pupils were not anisochoric (i.e. were of the same size) and (as would not be so in a case of atropine poisoning) were responsive to light. His mental state began to return to normal 19 hours after admission to A&E, although his intermittent confusion persisted. He finally regained alert (normal) mentation 28 hours after admission.

=== Suspect Korean wild vegetable ===
In regard to the poisoning case described above, the chef involved may have been neither careless nor inexperienced, but simply preparing a traditional namul, since at least one work on the edible wild plants of Korea maintains Lamprocapnos spectabilis to be edible, provided that it has first been subjected to certain treatments. Lee stipulates that the young leaves should be blanched slightly and then placed in cold water which is then brought to the boil; after which treatment they may be eaten with other vegetables or used in the preparation of miso soup. He further states that the flowers may be dried in the shade and used as tea. It is clear that, in the light of the findings of Jeong et al. regarding the restaurant poisoning incident, the plant is alkaloidal and, at best, a suspect foodstuff requiring pre-treatment in order to render it safe for human consumption (compare preparation of poke sallet from Phytolacca americana). Other factors influencing potential toxicity include variations in alkaloid content depending on the strain of plant involved, the stage of development/time of year at which the leaves were gathered and the pre-existing state of health of the consumer.

== Chemistry ==
Lamprocapnos spectabilis has yielded, by methanol extraction, 0.17% of combined alkaloids from above-ground parts and 0.25% from the roots. The alkaloids present are dihydrosanguinarine, sanguinarine, scoulerine, cheilanthifoline, corydine, and protopine. a Korean source lists also cryptopine, coptisine, chelerythrine, chelirubine, chelilutine and reticuline.

The alkaloids sanguinarine and dihydrosanguinarine – named for Sanguinaria canadensis (family Papaveraceae) – are also present in the seeds of Argemone mexicana (family Papaveraceae), the oil from which is a dangerous contaminant of mustard oil, responsible for the potentially fatal condition of epidemic dropsy.

== Biotechnology ==
The biotechnology of Lamprocapnos spectabilis encompasses various advanced techniques to enhance its cultivation and preservation. Micropropagation allows for the rapid multiplication of plants under sterile conditions, ensuring the production of disease-free and genetically uniform specimens. Mutation breeding involves exposing plant tissues to mutagens to create genetic variations that can lead to desirable traits such as improved growth habits. Cryopreservation is employed to conserve genetic resources by freezing plant tissues at ultra-low temperatures, maintaining their viability for future use. Additionally, the application of nanoparticles in Lamprocapnos biotechnology has shown potential in improving plant growth.

== Gallery ==
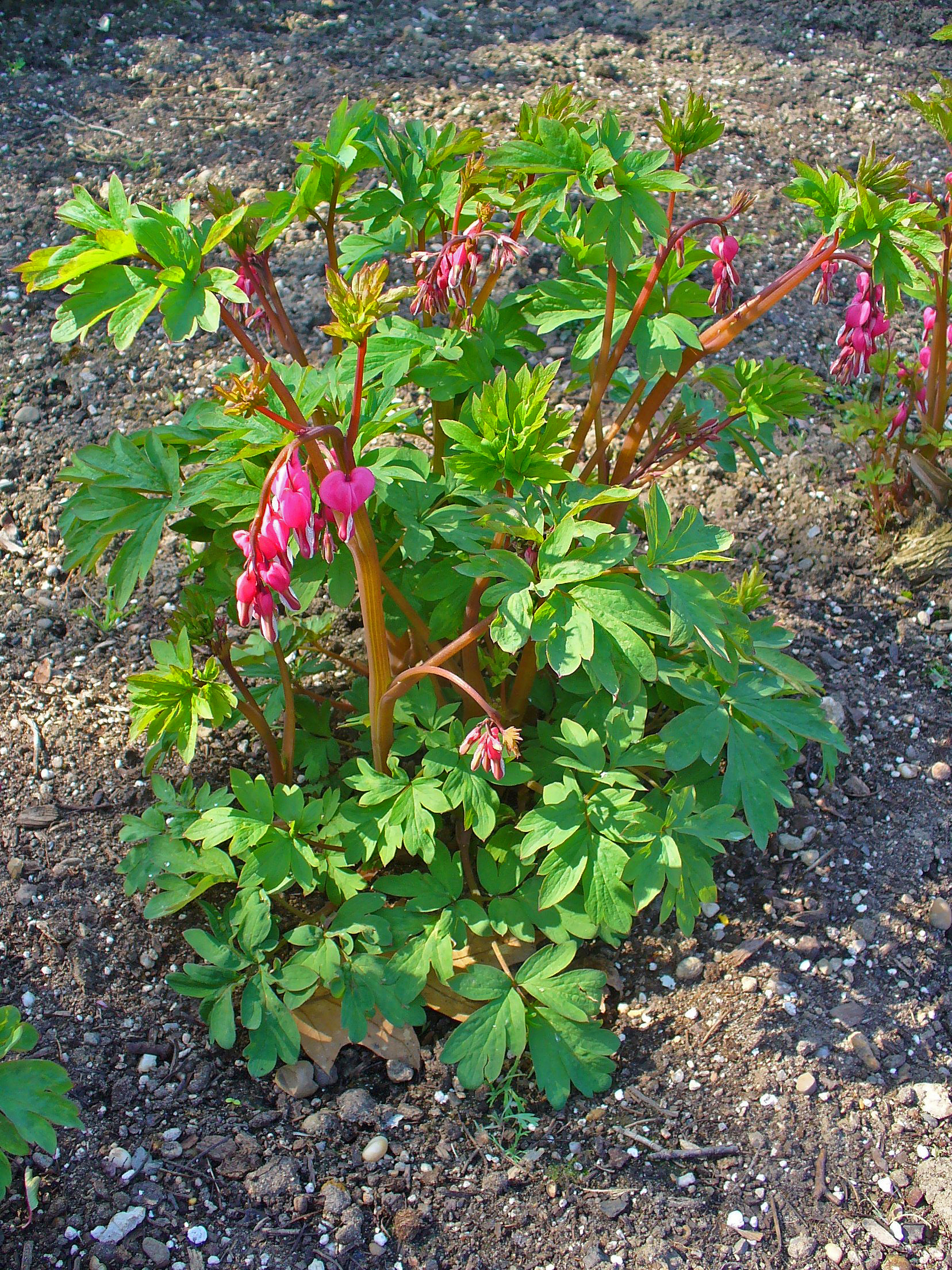
Foliage and buds

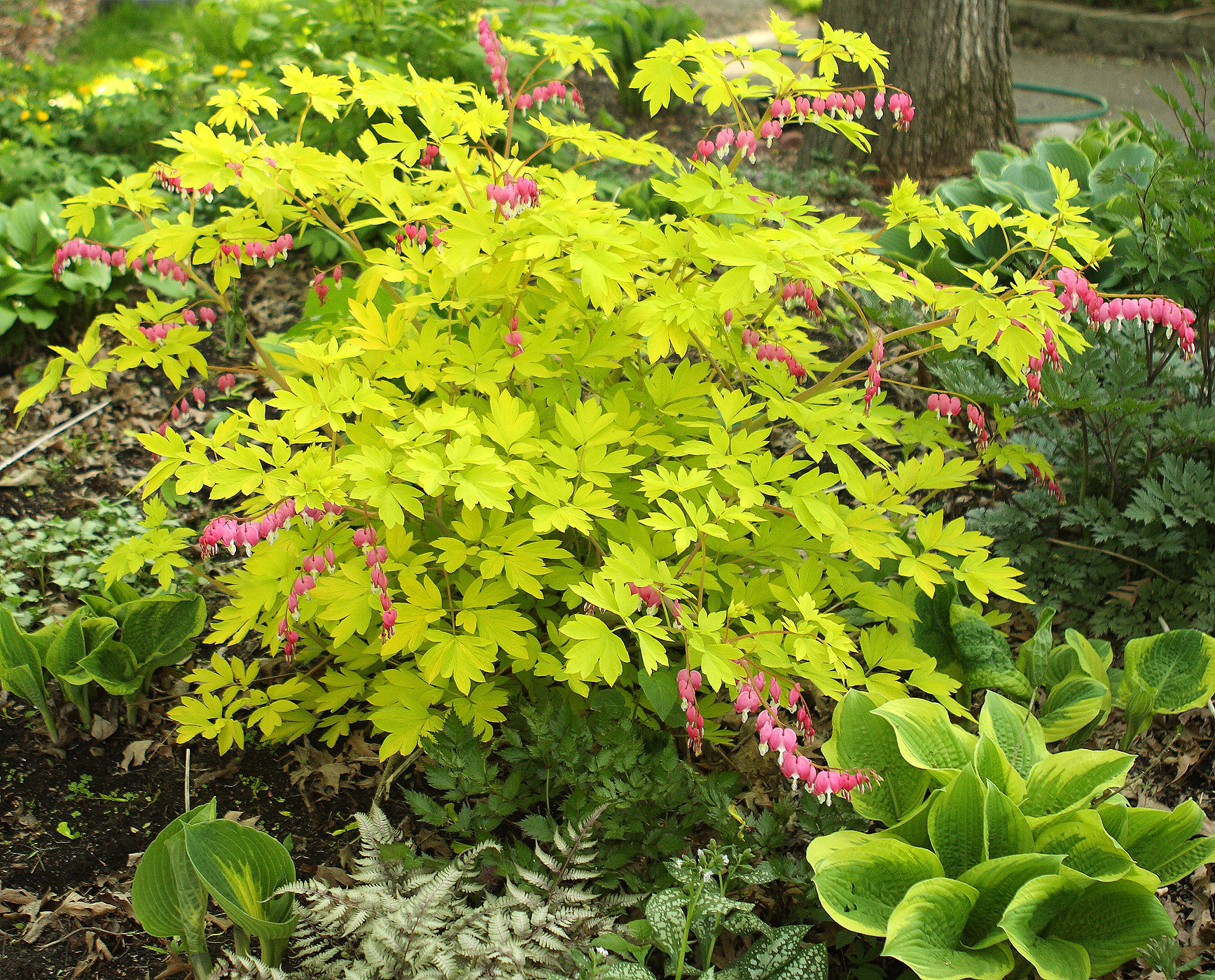
Cultivar 'Goldheart'

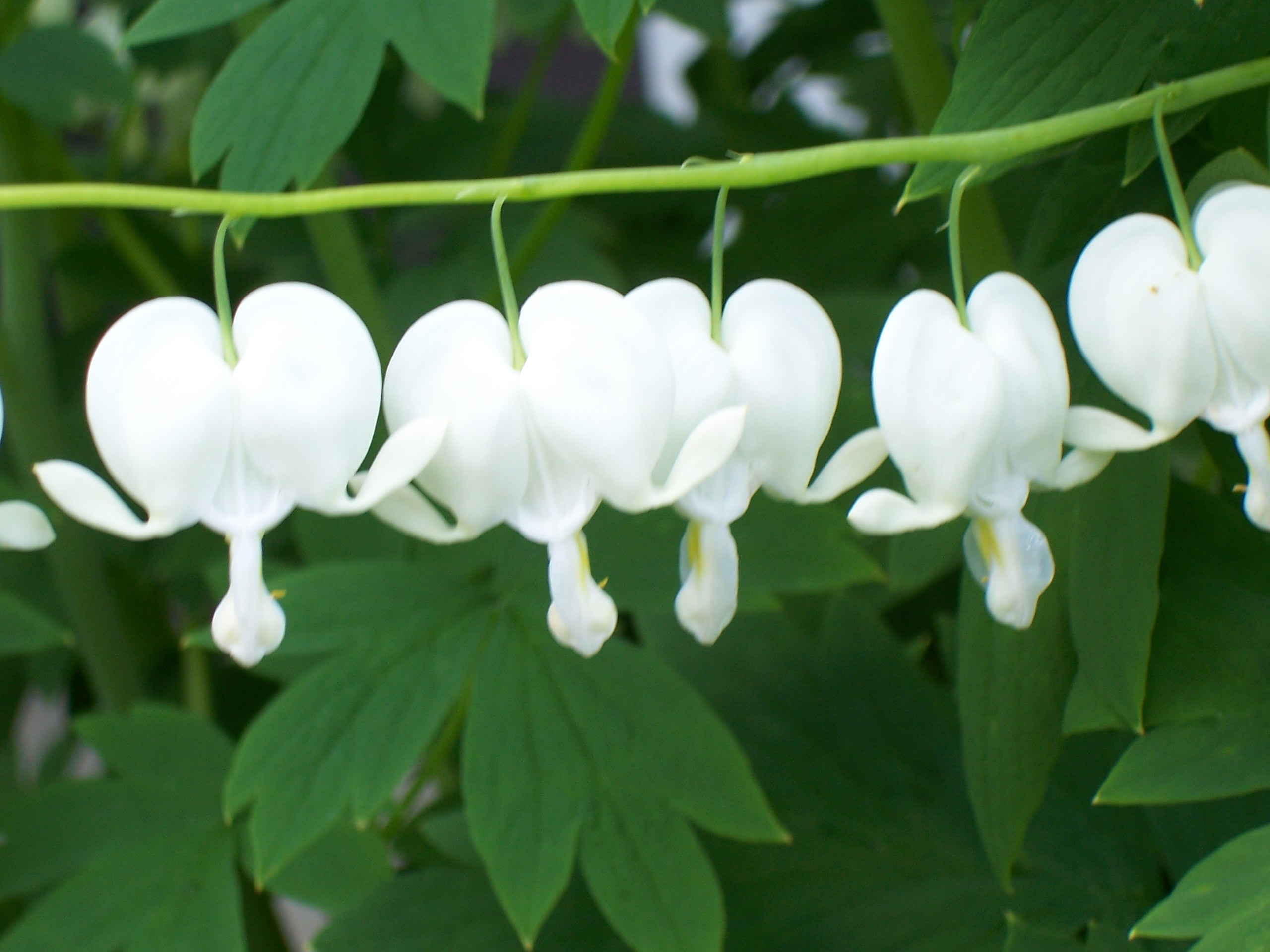
Cultivar 'Alba'

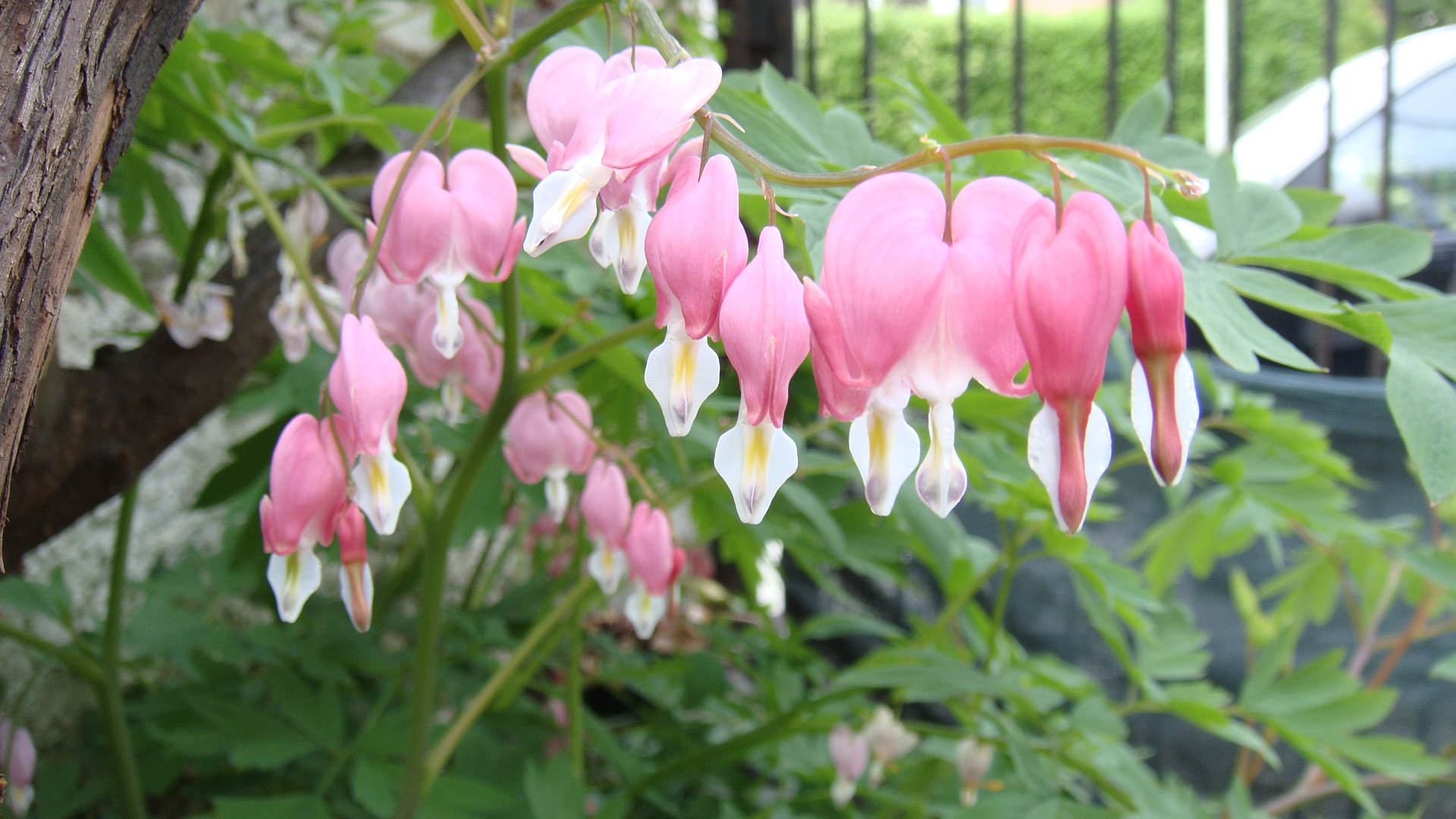
Close-up of inflorescence of pink form
