= C21H23NO5 =

The molecular formula C_{21}H_{23}NO_{5} (molar mass: 369.41 g/mol, exact mass: 369.1576 u) may refer to:

- Allocryptopine
- Cryptopine
- Heroin, or diacetylmorphine
