= Neoplasene =

Neoplasene is an herbal veterinary medicine derived from certain chemicals, such as sanguinarine, extracted from the perennial herb Sanguinaria canadensis (the bloodroot plant). It is used to treat cancer in pet animals, especially dogs. Its effectiveness is unproven and there are serious adverse effects.
