= DHBP =

DHBP may refer to:

- Dihydrobenzophenanthridine oxidase
- Dehydrobenzperidol, also called Droperidol
