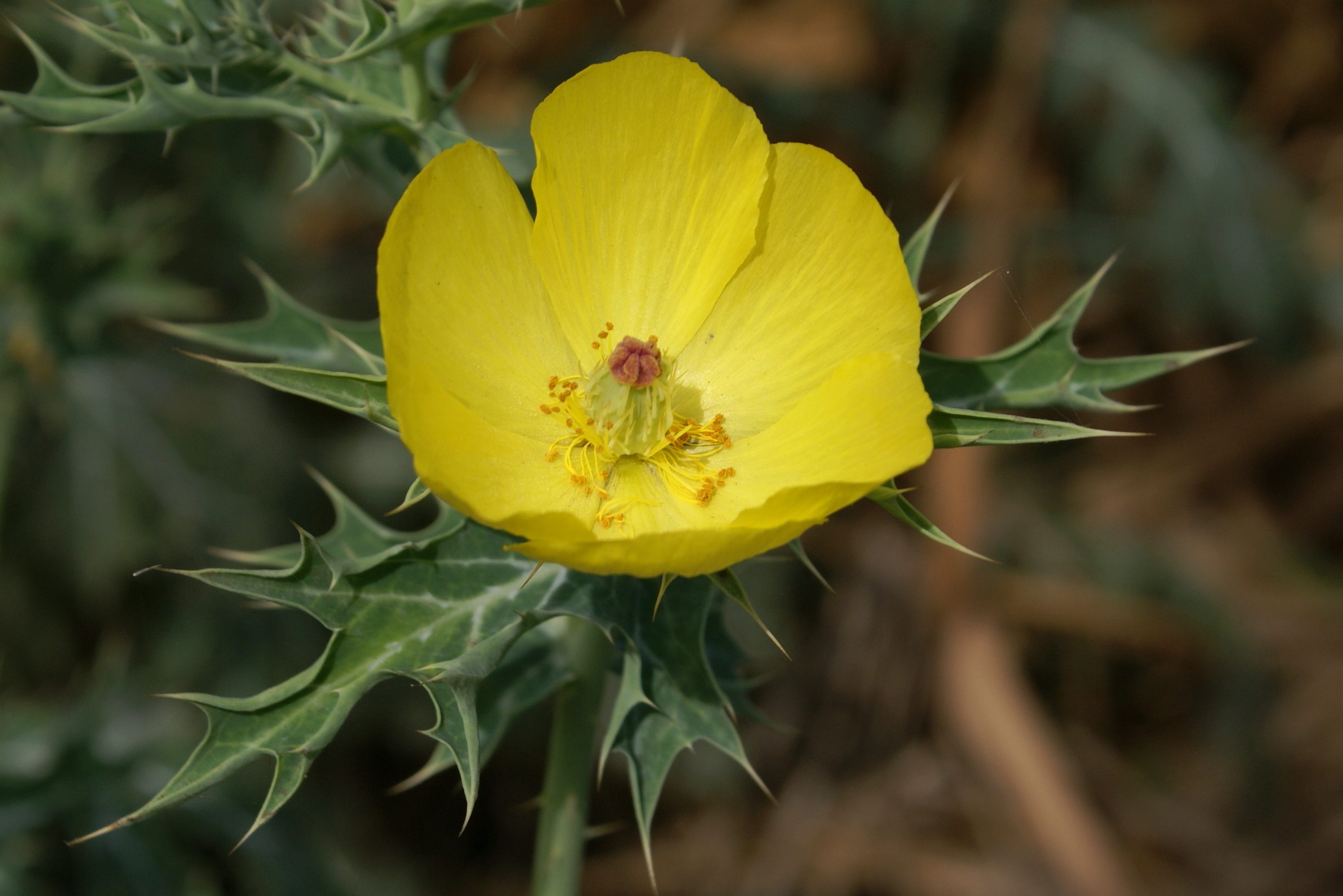

Scientific classification
- Kingdom: Plantae
- Clade: Tracheophytes
- Clade: Angiosperms
- Clade: Eudicots
- Order: Ranunculales
- Family: Papaveraceae
- Genus: Argemone
- Species: A. mexicana

Binomial name
- Argemone mexicana L.

= Argemone mexicana =

Species of plant

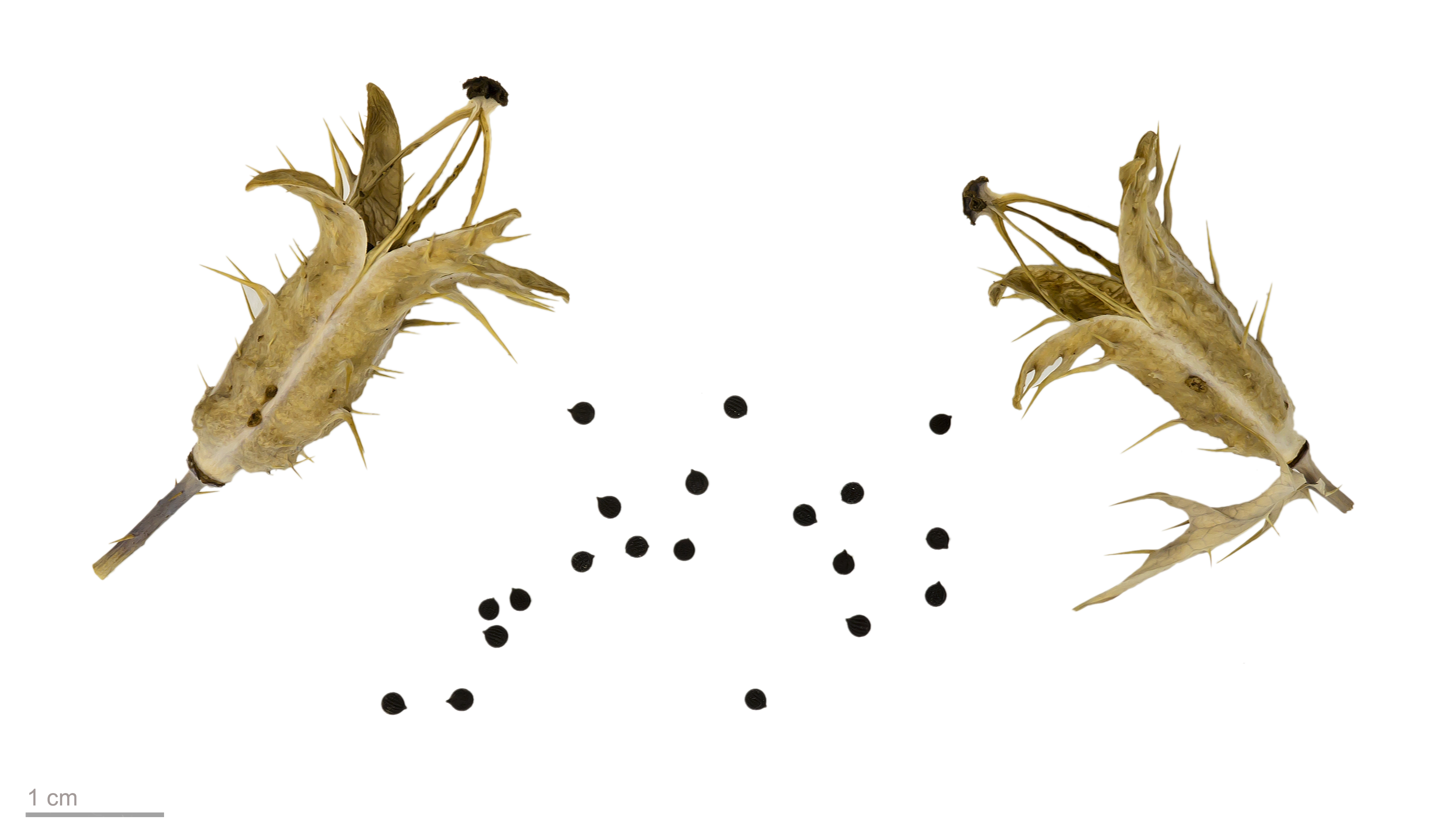
Argemone mexicana – MHNT

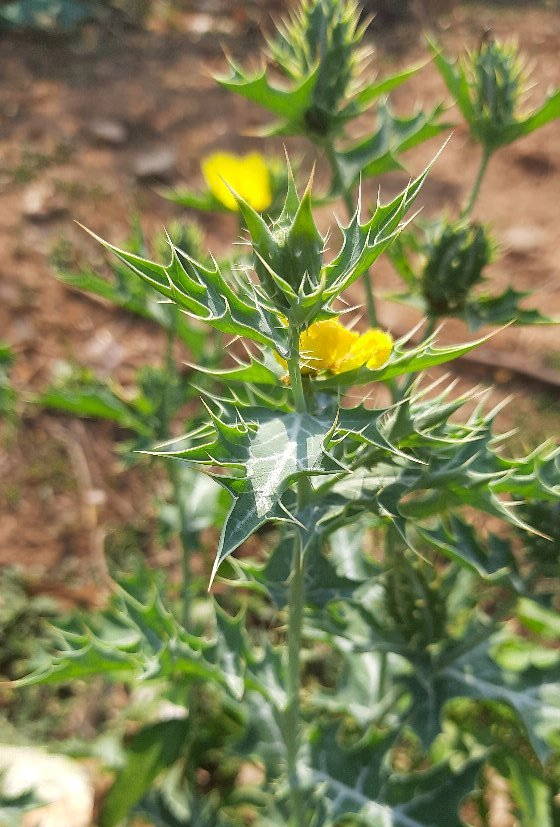
Flower bud of prickly poppy, which is a common weed of India. Picture is taken at Beliatore, West Bengal, India

Argemone mexicana, also known by the common names Mexican poppy, Mexican prickly poppy, flowering thistle, cardo, and cardosanto, is a species of poppy found in Mexico and now widely naturalized in many parts of the world. An extremely hardy pioneer plant, it is tolerant of drought and poor soil, often being the only cover on new road cuttings or verges. It has bright yellow latex. It is poisonous to grazing animals, and it is rarely eaten, but it has been used medicinally by many peoples, including those in its native area, as well as the indigenous peoples of the western United States, parts of Mexico, and many parts of India. In India, during the colorful festival Holika Dahan, adults and children worship by offering flowers, and this species is in its maximum flowering phase during March when the Holi festival is celebrated. It is also referred to as "Kanteli Ka Phul" and "Satyanashi" in India.

== Chemical constituents ==
Protopine

Argemone mexicana seeds contain 22–36% of a pale yellow non-edible oil, called argemone oil or katkar oil, which contains the toxic alkaloids sanguinarine and dihydrosanguinarine. Four quaternary isoquinoline alkaloids, dehydrocorydalmine, jatrorrhizine, columbamine, and oxyberberine, have been isolated from the whole plant of Argemone mexicana. Many other alkaloids such as argemexicaines A and B, argemonine (N meth pavine), Argepavine, O CH3 Argepavine, argemexirine, argenaxine, Argemexicaines A and B (protopine type), coptisine, cryptopine, allocryptopine and chelerythrine have also been found in this plant.

The seed pods secrete a pale yellow latex when cut open. This argemone resin contains berberine and protopine.

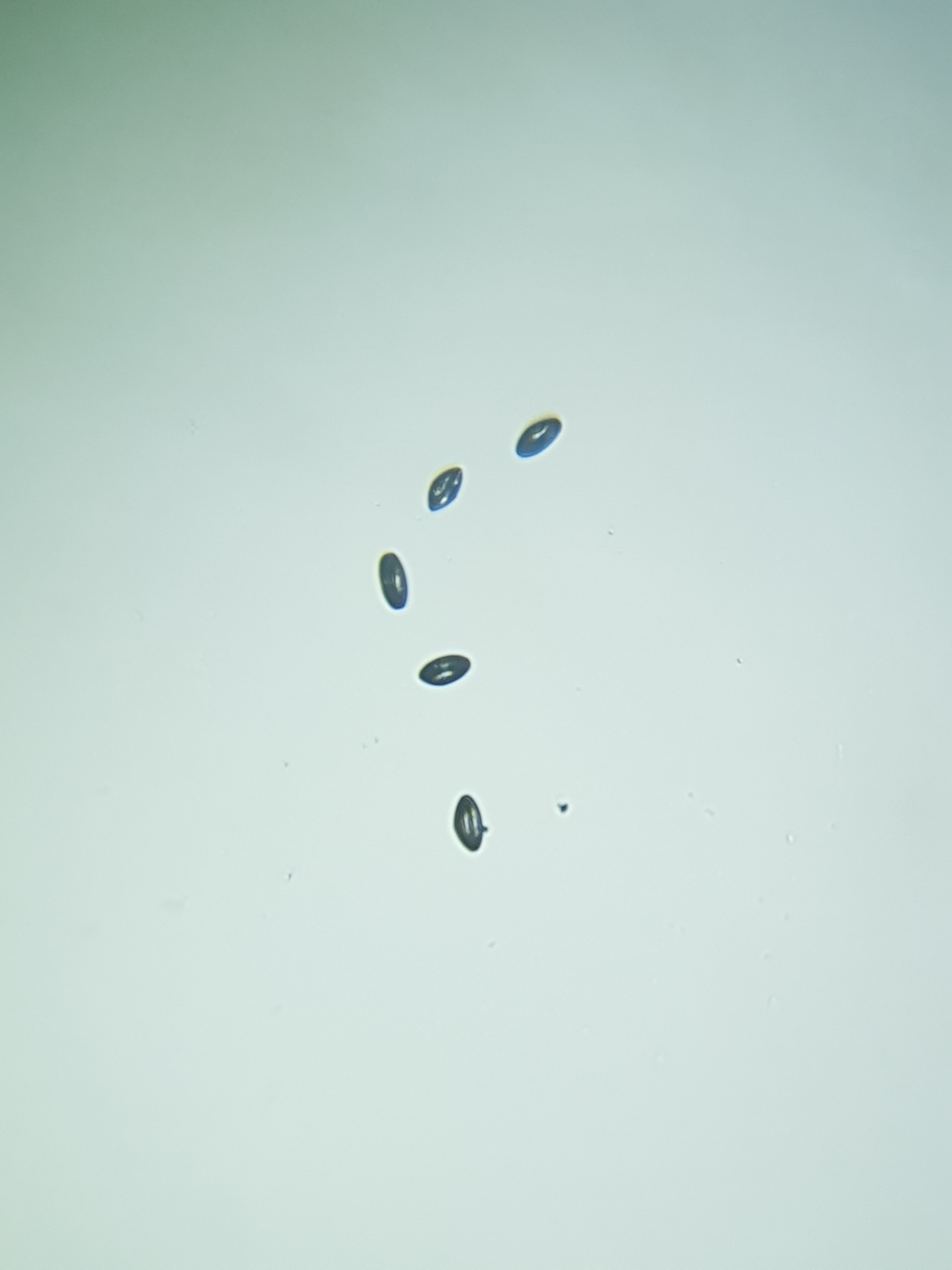
pollen grain of 'Mexican prickly poppy'

== Toxicity ==
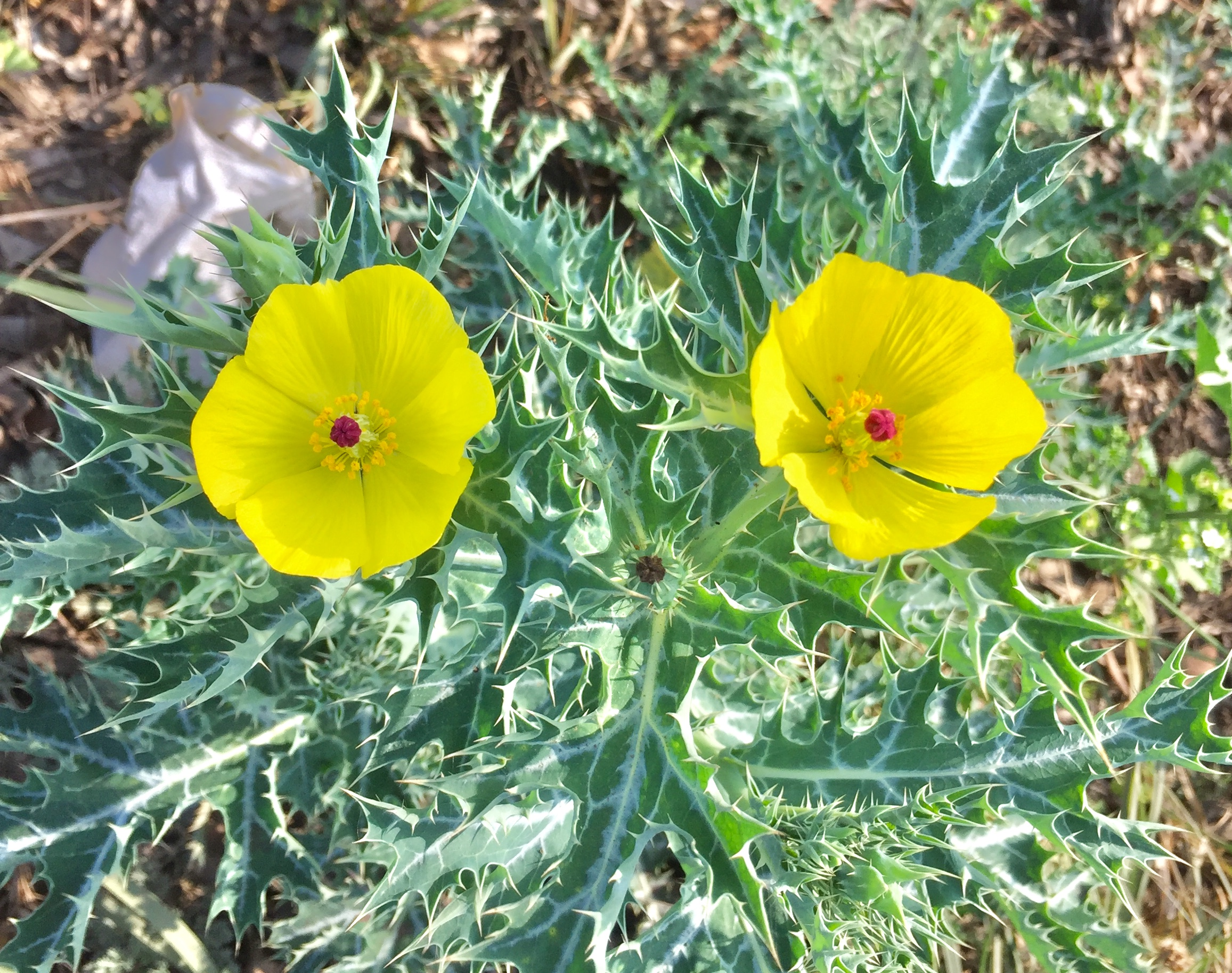
Argemone Mexicana, Village Bharaj Sangrur

The seeds resemble the seeds of Brassica nigra (mustard). As a result, mustard can be adulterated by argemone seeds, rendering it poisonous. Several significant instances of katkar poisoning have been reported in India, Fiji, South Africa and other countries. The last major outbreak in India occurred in 1998. 1% adulteration of mustard oil by argemone oil has been shown to cause clinical disease. In India, Argemone oil is mixed with sunflower oil and sesame oil to increase the quantity, but this adulteration causes health disorders and renowned brands display "no argemone oil" to qualify purity.

Katkar oil poisoning causes epidemic dropsy, with symptoms including extreme swelling, particularly of the legs. All parts of plants are poisonous. Ingestion of them can cause perianal itching, pneumonia myocarditis and congestive cardiac failure, ascites, sarcoid-like skin changes, alopecia, hepatomegaly

== Traditional medicine ==
The Seri of Sonora, Mexico use the entire plant both fresh and dried. An infusion is made to relieve kidney pain post-natally. When the Spanish arrived in Sonora, they called it cardosanto, taken as a laxative. An Argemone mexicana tea is used in Mali to treat malaria. In the traditional medicine of India, the yellow sap of A. mexicana and the whole plant may be used as a supposed treatment for jaundice.

== Other uses ==
Biodiesel production from A. mexicana seed oil using crystalline manganese carbonate has been demonstrated.

== Invasiveness ==
=== South Africa ===
In South Africa, A. mexicana is classified as a category 1b invader in the National Environmental Management: Biodiversity Act. This indicates most activities with regards to the species are prohibited (such as importing, propagating, translocating or trading).

== See also ==
- List of poisonous plants
