= Dihydrosanguinarine 10-monooxygenase =

Class of enzymes

dihydrosanguinarine 10-monooxygenase

Identifiers
- EC no.: 1.14.13.56
- CAS no.: 144388-41-0

Databases
- BRENDA: enzyme data
- ExPASy: NiceZyme view
- KEGG: enzyme entry
- MetaCyc: metabolic pathway
- Rhea: reactions
- PDB structures: RCSB PDB PDBe PDBsum
- Gene Ontology: AmiGO / QuickGO
Search
- PMC: articles
- PubMed: articles
- NCBI: proteins

In enzymology, a dihydrosanguinarine 10-monooxygenase (EC 1.14.13.56) is an enzyme that catalyzes the chemical reaction

dihydrosanguinarine + NADPH + H^{+} + O_{2} $\rightleftharpoons$ 10-hydroxydihydrosanguinarine + NADP^{+} + H_{2}O

The 4 substrates of this enzyme are dihydrosanguinarine, NADPH, H^{+}, and O_{2}, whereas its 3 products are 10-hydroxydihydrosanguinarine, NADP^{+}, and H_{2}O.

This enzyme belongs to the family of oxidoreductases, specifically those acting on paired donors, with O2 as oxidant and incorporation or reduction of oxygen. The oxygen incorporated need not be derived from O2 with NADH or NADPH as one donor, and incorporation of one atom o oxygen into the other donor. The systematic name of this enzyme class is dihydrosanguinarine,NADPH:oxygen oxidoreductase (10-hydroxylating). This enzyme is also called dihydrosanguinarine 10-hydroxylase. This enzyme participates in alkaloid biosynthesis.
