= Charlatan =

Person engaging in deceptive practices

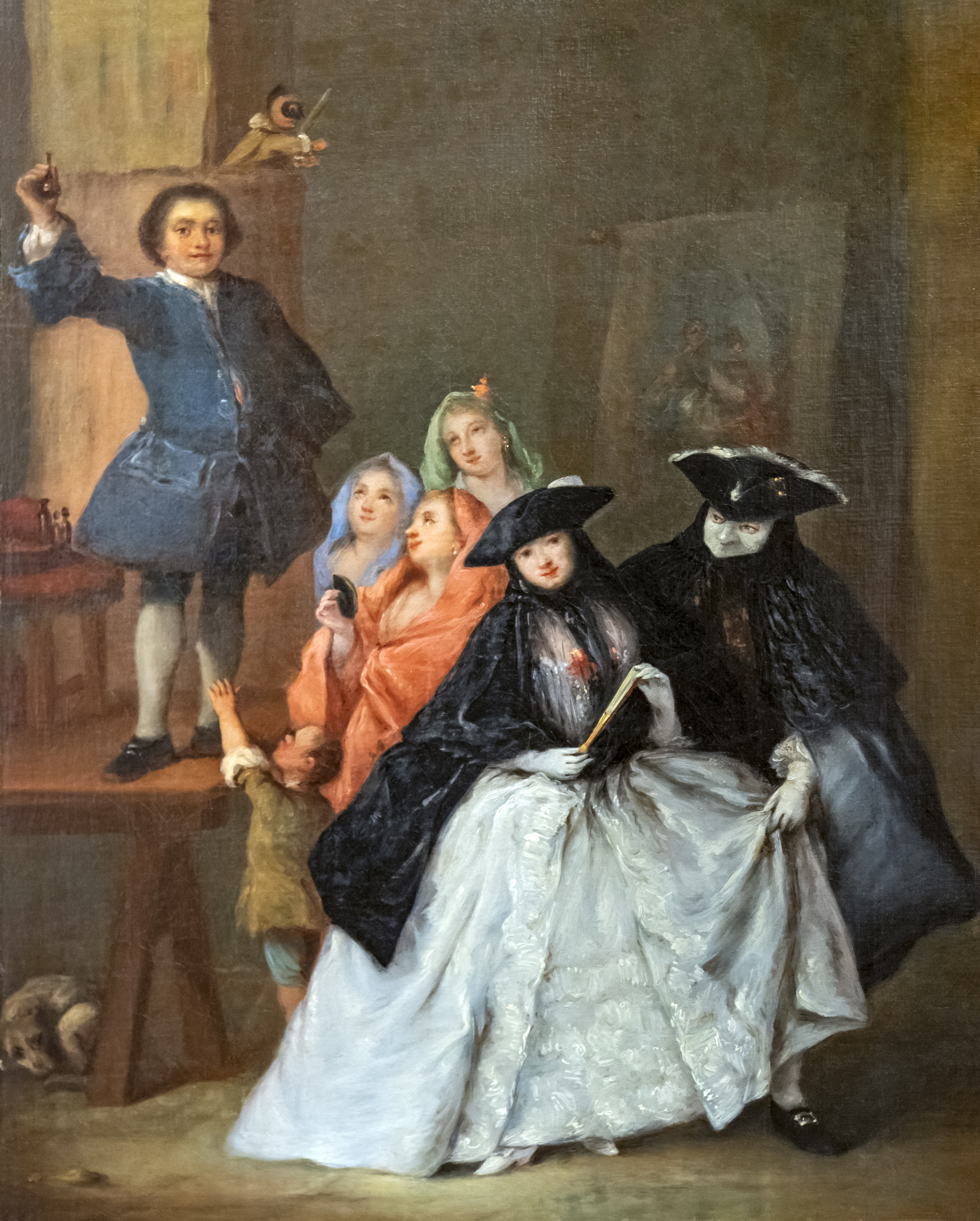
Pietro Longhi: The Charlatan, 1757

A charlatan (also called a swindler or mountebank) is a person practicing quackery or a similar confidence trick in order to obtain money, power, fame, or other advantages through pretense or deception. One example of a charlatan appears in the Canterbury Tales story "The Pardoner's Tale," with the Pardoner who tricks sinners into buying fake religious relics. Synonyms for charlatan include shyster, quack, or faker. Quack is a reference to quackery or the practice of dubious medicine, including the sale of snake oil, or a person who does not have medical training who purports to provide medical services.

== Etymology ==
The English word comes from French charlatan, a seller of medicines who might advertise his presence with music and an outdoor stage show. The best known of the Parisian charlatans was Tabarin, whose skits and farces – which were influenced by commedia dell'arte – inspired the 17th century playwright Molière. The word is also similar to Spanish charlatán, an indiscreetly talkative person, a chatterbox. Etymologists trace charlatan ultimately from Italian, either from ciarlare, to chatter or prattle; or Cerretano, a resident of Cerreto, a village in Umbria, known for its quacks in the 16th century, or a mixture of both.

== Usage ==
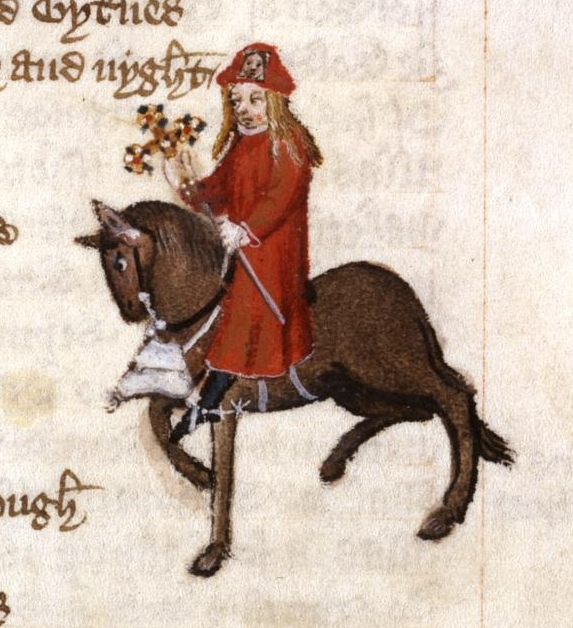
The Pardoner, from the Ellesmere Chaucer

A distinction is drawn between the charlatan and other kinds of confidence tricksters. The charlatan is usually a salesperson of a certain service or product, who has no personal relationship with his "marks" (customers or clients), and avoids elaborate hoaxes or roleplaying con-games. Rather, the person called a charlatan is being accused of resorting to quackery, pseudoscience, or other knowingly employed bogus means of impressing people in order to swindle victims by selling them worthless nostrums and similar goods or services that will not deliver on the promises made for them. One example of a charlatan is a 19th-century medicine show operator, who has long since left town by the time the people who bought his "snake oil" or similarly named "cure-all" tonic realize that it was a scam. A misdirection by a charlatan is a confuddle, a dropper is a leader of a group of conmen, and hangmen are conmen that present false checks. A gaff means to trick or con and a mugu is a victim of a rigged game.

In reported spiritual communications, a charlatan is a person who fakes evidence that a spirit is "making contact" with the medium and seekers. Notable people who have successfully debunked the claims of purported supernatural mediums include magician/scientific skeptic James Randi, Brazilian writer Monteiro Lobato and magician Harry Houdini.

== Infamous individuals ==
- Albert Abrams, the advocate of radionics and other similar electrical quackery who was active in the early twentieth century.
- Amy Bock, a 19th–20th century New Zealand con artist who began by committing a series of petty scams, such as taking watches for "repair" and then claiming to have lost them, making purchases under her employer or acquaintance's name without permission, and claiming to sell tickets to concerts or events—and eventually became notorious for defrauding families and individuals on a larger scale, through cross-dressing, presenting as a wealthy man, and courting and marrying a wealthy young woman in an elaborate scheme to gain money and evade debts.
- John R. Brinkley, the "goat-gland doctor" who implanted goat glands as a means of curing male impotence, helped pioneer both American and Mexican radio broadcasting, and twice ran unsuccessfully for governor of Kansas.
- Alfredo Bowman, who claimed to cure all disease with herbs and a unique vegan, alkaline diet.
- Alessandro Cagliostro, (real name Giuseppe Balsamo) who claimed to be a count.
- Mary Carleton, a 17th-century English socialite and fraudster, written about by her contemporary Samuel Pepys, who used a number of false identities, particularly that of a supposed "German princess," to marry and defraud upper-class men.
- Billie Sol Estes, a famous 20th-century Texas conman.
- Elizabeth Holmes, 21st-century conwoman who defrauded investors and misled US government regulators by falsely claiming her health technology company, Theranos, had invented a new blood-testing method.
- Gustavus Katterfelto, an 18th-century Prussian conjurer who used a solar microscope which he claimed could detect disease.
- Ivar Kreuger, the Swedish "Match King", who ran a worldwide Ponzi scheme in the 1920s.
- Bernie Madoff, a 20th-century American stockbroker who ran the world's largest Ponzi scheme, defrauding investors out of $18 billion.
- Elisha Perkins, an 18th-century American inventor of his own quack therapy that utilized "tractors".
- John Henry Pinkard, 19th-20th century Roanoke, Virginia, businessman and purveyor of quack medicines.
- Charles Ponzi, 19th-20th century Italian scammer for whom the "Ponzi scheme" is named, a scam that relies on a pyramid of investors who contribute money to a fraudulent programme, typically where money from later investors is used to pay unusually high returns to earlier investors, thus allowing and promoting the growth of the scheme.
- Peter Popoff, exposed in 1986 by magician James Randi
- Gert Postel, a 20th-century German fraud who feigned experience in the field of psychiatry and became a senior physician, despite having no training.
- Grigori Rasputin, a 19th–20th century self-proclaimed holy man and healer who gained considerable influence on the family of Tsar Nicholas II and was involved in the political turmoil on the brink of the Russian Revolution.
- Kevin Trudeau, convicted of fraud, larceny, and contempt of court.

== See also ==
- Cerreto di Spoleto
- Confidence trick
- Fraud
- Impostor
- Poseur
- Pseudoscience
- Quackery
