= Epidemic dropsy =

Epidemic Dropsy
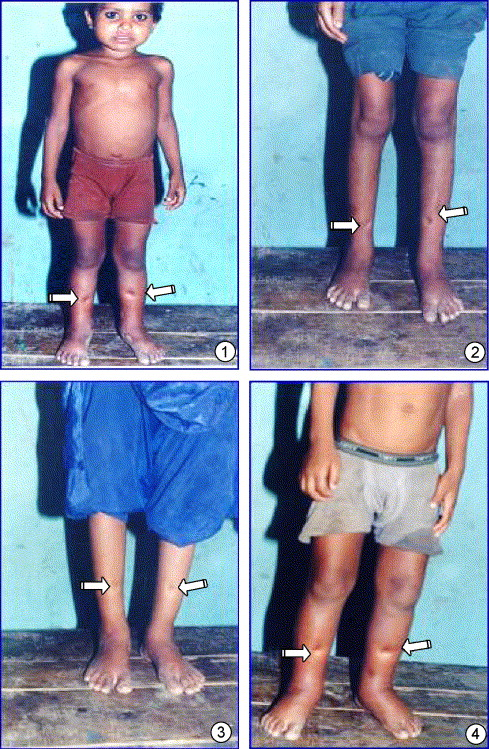
- Epidemic dropsy patients with the characteristic bilateral pitting edema of the extremities (indicated by arrows)
- Specialty: Emergency medicine

Epidemic dropsy is a form of edema of extremities due to poisoning by Argemone mexicana (Mexican prickly poppy).

Epidemic dropsy is a clinical state resulting from use of edible oils adulterated with Argemone mexicana seed oil.

Sanguinarine and dihydrosanguinarine are two major toxic alkaloids of argemone oil, which cause widespread capillary dilation, proliferation and increased capillary permeability. When mustard oil is adulterated deliberately (as in most cases) or accidentally with argemone oil, proteinuria (specifically loss of albumin) occurs, with a resultant edema as would occur in nephrotic syndrome.

Other major symptoms are bilateral pitting edema of extremities, headache, nausea, loose bowels, erythema, glaucoma and breathlessness.

Leakage of the protein-rich plasma component into the extracellular compartment leads to the formation of edema. The haemodynamic consequences of this vascular dilatation and permeability lead to a state of relative hypovolemia with a constant stimulus for fluid and salt conservation by the kidneys. Illness begins with gastroenteric symptoms followed by cutaneous erythema and pigmentation. Respiratory symptoms such as cough, shortness of breath and orthopnoea, progressing to frank right-sided congestive cardiac failure, are seen.

Mild to moderate anaemia, hypoproteinaemia, mild to moderate renal azotemia, retinal haemorrhages, and glaucoma are common manifestations. There is no specific therapy. Removal of the adulterated oil and symptomatic treatment of congestive cardiac failure and respiratory symptoms, along with administration of antioxidants and multivitamins, remain the mainstay of treatment.

Epidemic dropsy occurs as an epidemic in places where use of mustard oil from the seeds of Brassica juncea, commonly known as Indian mustard, as a cooking medium is common. This is because there is an increased chance of adulteration (with argemone oil) and consumption of such adulterated mustard oil in these areas.

== Signs and symptoms ==
Dropsy patients develop proteinuria specifically due to loss of albumin, with a resultant edema as would occur in nephrotic syndrome.

Major symptoms observed in patients are bilateral pitting edema of extremities, headache, nausea, loose bowels, erythema, glaucoma and breathlessness.

Illness begins with gastroenteric symptoms followed by cutaneous erythema and pigmentation. Respiratory symptoms such as cough, shortness of breath and orthopnoea. In severe cases the before mentioned conditions will progress to frank right-sided congestive cardiac failure and death of the patient.

== Cause ==
=== Argemone mexicana ===
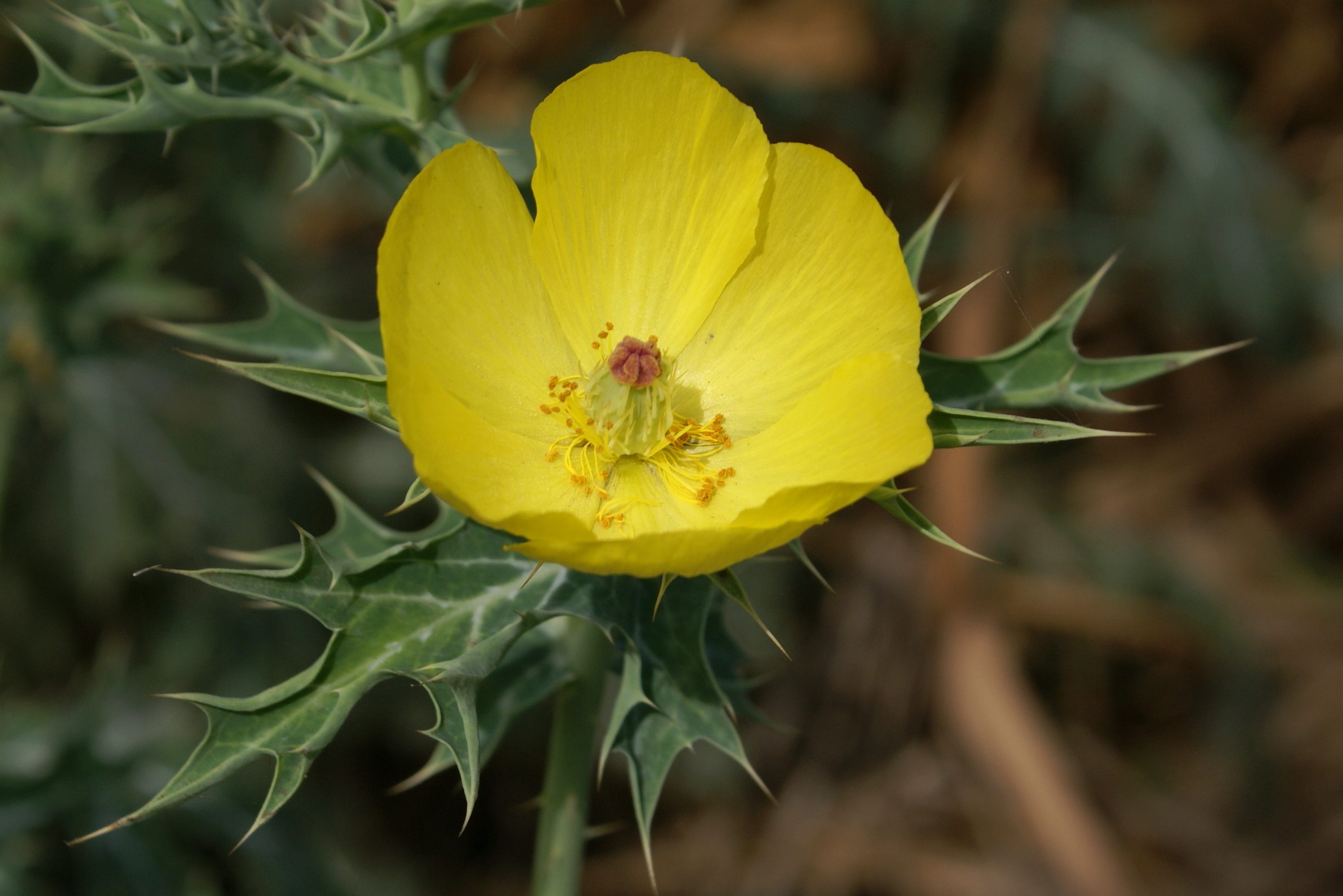
Argemone mexicana

Argemone mexicana (family Papaveraceae), a native of West Indies and naturalized in India, is known as “Shailkanta” in Bengal and “Bharbhanda” in Uttar Pradesh. It is also popularly known as “Pivladhatura” or “Satyanashi”, meaning devastating. The plant grows wildly in mustard and other fields. Its seeds are black in colour and are similar to the dark coloured mustards seeds (Brassica juncea) in shape and size. Adulteration of argemone seeds in light yellow colored mustard seeds (Brassica compestris) can easily be detected, but these seeds are rather difficult to visualize when mixed with dark coloured mustard seeds.

Argemone seeds yield approximately 35% oil. Alkaloid content in argemone oil varies from 0.44% to 0.50%. Argemone seeds find use as a substitute because of the easy availability, low cost and their complete miscibility of their oil with mustard oil.

== Mechanism ==
Mortality is usually due to heart failure, pneumonia, respiratory distress syndrome or renal failure and is around 5%. Long-term follow-up studies are scanty so the long-term effects of argemone oil toxicity have not been documented. It has been reported that 25% of cases will have edema beyond 2 months and 10% beyond 5 months. Pigmentation of skin and excessive loss of hair, which lasted 4–5 months following the disease. The majority of patients completely recover in about 3 months.

Reactive oxygen species and oxidative stress: Studies of the blood of dropsy patients has revealed that there is extensive reactive oxygen species (ROS) production (singlet oxygen and hydrogen peroxide) in the argemone oil intoxication leading to depletion of total antioxidants in the body and especially lipid-soluble antioxidants such as vitamin E and A (tocopherol and retinol). There is an extensive damage to the anti-oxidant (AO) defense system (anti-oxidant enzymes and anti-oxidants) of blood. Prior in vitro studies have shown that ROS are involved in AO induced toxicity causing peroxidative damage of lipids in various hepatic sub-cellular fractions including microsomes and mitochondria of rats. The damage in hepatic microsomal membrane causes loss of activity of cytochrome P-450 and other membrane bound enzymes responsible for xenobiotic metabolism which leads to delayed bioelimination of sanguinarine and enhances its cumulative toxicity. Several lines of evidence have been shown to explain the mechanism of toxicity of argemone oil/alkaloid. The toxicity of sanguinarine has been shown to be dependent on the reactivity of its iminium bond with nucleophilic sites like thiol groups, present at the active sites of the enzymes and other vital proteins and thus suggesting the electrophilic nature of the alkaloid.

Pulmonary toxicity: The decrease in glycogen levels following argemone oil intoxication could be due to enhanced glycogenolysis leading to the formation of glucose-1-phosphate, which enters the glycolytic pathway resulting in accumulation of pyruvate in the blood of experimental animals and dropsy patients. The enhancement of glycogenolysis can further be supported by the interference of sanguinarine in the uptake of glucose through blocking of sodium pump via Na^{+}-K^{+}-ATPase and thereby inhibiting the active transport of glucose across the intestinal barrier. It is well established that increased pyruvate concentration in blood uncouples oxidative phosphorylation, and this may be responsible for thickening of interalveolar septa and disorganized alveolar spaces in lungs of argemone oil-fed rats and the breathlessness as has been observed in human victims.

Cardiac failure: The inhibition of Na^{+}-K^{+}-ATPase activity of heart by sanguinarine is due to interaction with the cardiac glycoside receptor site of the enzyme, which may be responsible for producing degenerative changes in cardiac muscle fibers in the auricular wall of rats fed argemone oil and could be related to tachycardia and cardiac failure in epidemic dropsy patients.

Delayed clearance: Destruction of hepatic cytochrome P450 significantly affects the metabolic clearance by liver. The retention of sanguinarine in the gastrointestinal (GI) tract, liver, lung, kidney, heart and serum even after 96 hrs of exposure indicates these as the likely target sites of argemone oil toxicity.

== Diagnosis ==
Nitric acid test and paper chromatography test are used in the detection of argemone oil. The paper chromatography test is the most sensitive test.

== Treatment ==
Withdrawal of the contaminated cooking oil is the most important initial step. Bed rest with leg elevation and a protein-rich diet are useful. Supplements of calcium, antioxidants (vitamin C and E), and thiamine and other B vitamins are commonly used. Corticosteroids and antihistamines such as promethazine have been advocated by some investigators, but demonstrated efficacy is lacking. Diuretics are used universally but caution must be exercised not to deplete the intravascular volume unless features of frank congestive cardiac failure are present, as edema is mainly due to increased capillary permeability. Cardiac failure is managed by bed rest, salt restriction, digitalis and diuretics. Pneumonia is treated with appropriate antibiotics. Renal failure may need dialysis therapy and complete clinical recovery is seen. Glaucoma may need operative intervention, but generally responds to medical management.

== Prevalence ==
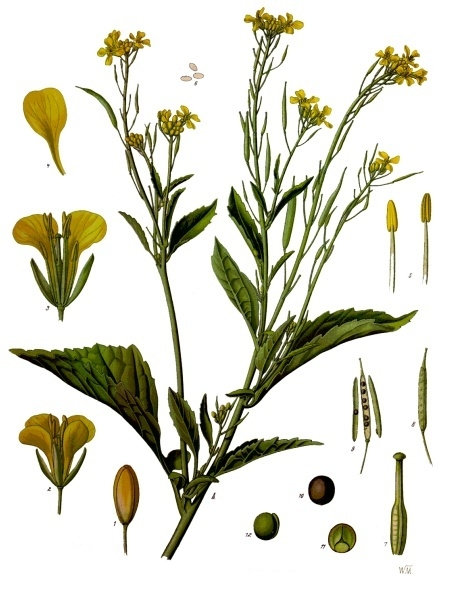
Brassica juncea

Besides India, widespread epidemics have been reported from Mauritius, Fiji Islands, Northwest Cape districts of South Africa, Madagascar and also from Nepal. Apart from a South African study, where the epidemic occurred through contamination in wheat flour, all the epidemics occurred through the consumption of mustard oil contaminated with argemone oil.

In these cultural populations mustard oil is the prime edible oil.

The earliest reference to argemone oil poisoning was made by Lyon, who reported four cases of poisoning in Calcutta in 1877 from the use of this oil in food.

Since then, epidemic dropsy has been reported from Bengal, Bihar, Orissa, Madhya Pradesh, Haryana, Assam, Jammu and Kashmir, Uttar Pradesh, Gujarat, Delhi and Maharashtra, mainly due to consumption of food cooked in argemone oil mixed with mustard oil or occasionally by body massage with contaminated oil.

The epidemic in 1998 at New Delhi, India is the largest so far, in which over 60 persons lost their lives and more than 3000 victims were hospitalized. Few studies reported the findings in patients affected with this condition.

Even after that the epidemics occurred at alarming frequency in Gwalior (2000), Kannauj (2002) and Lucknow (2005) cities of India. 6 possible cases with 2 deaths were reported in Gundari village in Banaskantha district of Gujarat in India were reported in June 2021.
