= Sanguinarine =

Chemical compound

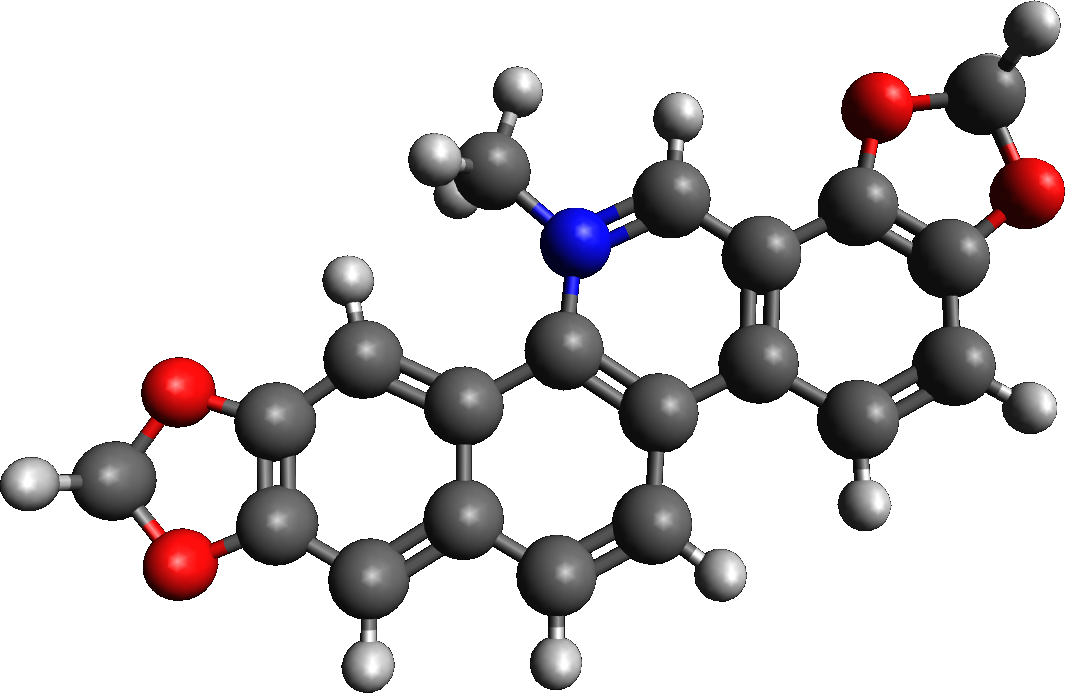

Clinical data
- ATC code: none

Identifiers
- IUPAC name: 13-Methyl-[1,3]benzodioxolo[5,6-c]-1,3-dioxolo[4,5-i]phenanthridinium
- CAS Number: 2447-54-3
- PubChem CID: 5154
- ChemSpider: 4970
- UNII: AV9VK043SS
- KEGG: C06162
- ChEBI: CHEBI:17183
- ChEMBL: ChEMBL417799
- CompTox Dashboard (EPA): DTXSID0045204
- ECHA InfoCard: 100.017.731

Chemical and physical data
- Formula: C_{20}H_{14}NO_{4}
- Molar mass: 332.335 g·mol^{−1}
- 3D model (JSmol): Interactive image
- SMILES: O1c3c(OC1)c2c[n+](c5c(c2cc3)ccc6cc4OCOc4cc56)C
- InChI: InChI=1S/C20H14NO4/c1-21-8-15-12(4-5-16-20(15)25-10-22-16)13-3-2-11-6-17-18(24-9-23-17)7-14(11)19(13)21/h2-8H,9-10H2,1H3/q+1; Key:INVGWHRKADIJHF-UHFFFAOYSA-N

Sanguinarine is a polycyclic quaternary alkaloid. It is extracted from some plants, including the bloodroot plant (Sanguinaria canadensis, from whose scientific name its name is derived), the Mexican prickly poppy (Argemone mexicana), Chelidonium majus, and Macleaya cordata.

== Toxicity ==
Sanguinarine is a toxin that kills animal cells through its action on the Na^{+}/K^{+}-ATPase transmembrane protein. Epidemic dropsy is a disease that results from ingesting sanguinarine.

If applied to the skin, sanguinarine may cause a massive scab of dead flesh where it killed the cells where it was applied, called an eschar. For this reason, sanguinarine is termed an escharotic.

It is said to be 2.5 times more toxic than dihydrosanguinarine.

== Alternative medicine ==
Native Americans once used bloodroot as a medical remedy, believing it had curative properties as an emetic, respiratory aid, and for a variety of ailments. In Colonial America, sanguinarine from bloodroot was used as a wart remedy. Later, in 1869, William Cook's The Physiomedical Dispensatory included information on the preparation and uses of sanguinarine. During the 1920s and 1930s, sanguinarine was the chief component of "Pinkard's Sanguinaria Compound," a drug sold by John Henry Pinkard. Pinkard advertised the compound as "a treatment, remedy, and cure for pneumonia, coughs, weak lungs, asthma, kidney, liver, bladder, or any stomach troubles, and effective as a great blood and nerve tonic." In 1931, several samples of the compound were seized by federal officials who determined Pinkard's claims to be fraudulent. Pinkard pleaded guilty in court and accepted a fine of $25.00.

More recently, sanguinarine from bloodroot has been promoted by many alternative medicine companies as a treatment or cure for cancer; however, the U.S. Food and Drug Administration warns that products containing bloodroot, or other sanguinarine-based plants, have no proven anti-cancer effects, and that they should be avoided on those grounds. Meanwhile, Australian Therapeutic Goods Administration also advise consumers not to purchase or use products marketed as containing Sanguinaria canadensis to cure or treat cancer, including certain types of skin cancer. Indeed, oral use of such products has been associated with oral leukoplakia, a possible precursor of oral cancer. In addition, the escharotic form of sanguinarine, applied to the skin for skin cancers, may leave cancerous cells alive in the skin while creating a significant scar. For this reason it is not recommended as a skin cancer treatment.

== Biosynthesis ==
In plants, sanguinarine biosynthesis begins with 4-hydroxyphenylacetaldehyde and dopamine. These two compounds are combined to form norcoclaurine. Next, methyl groups are added to form N-methylcoclaurine. The enzyme CYP80B1 subsequently adds a hydroxyl group, forming 3'-hydroxy-N-methylcoclaurine. The addition of another methyl group transforms this compound into (S)-reticuline.

Biosynthesis of sanguinarine up to this point is identical to that of morphine. However, only the (R) enantiomer of reticuline is converted to codeinone, which is on the pathway to morphine. For sanguinarine, (S)-reticuline is converted to scoulerine via berberine bridge enzyme (BBE), which is the commitment step in the sanguinarine pathway. A series of transformations then leads to dihydrosanguinarine, the immediate precursor to sanguinarine, which is oxidised to the final toxin by the enzyme dihydrobenzophenanthridine oxidase.

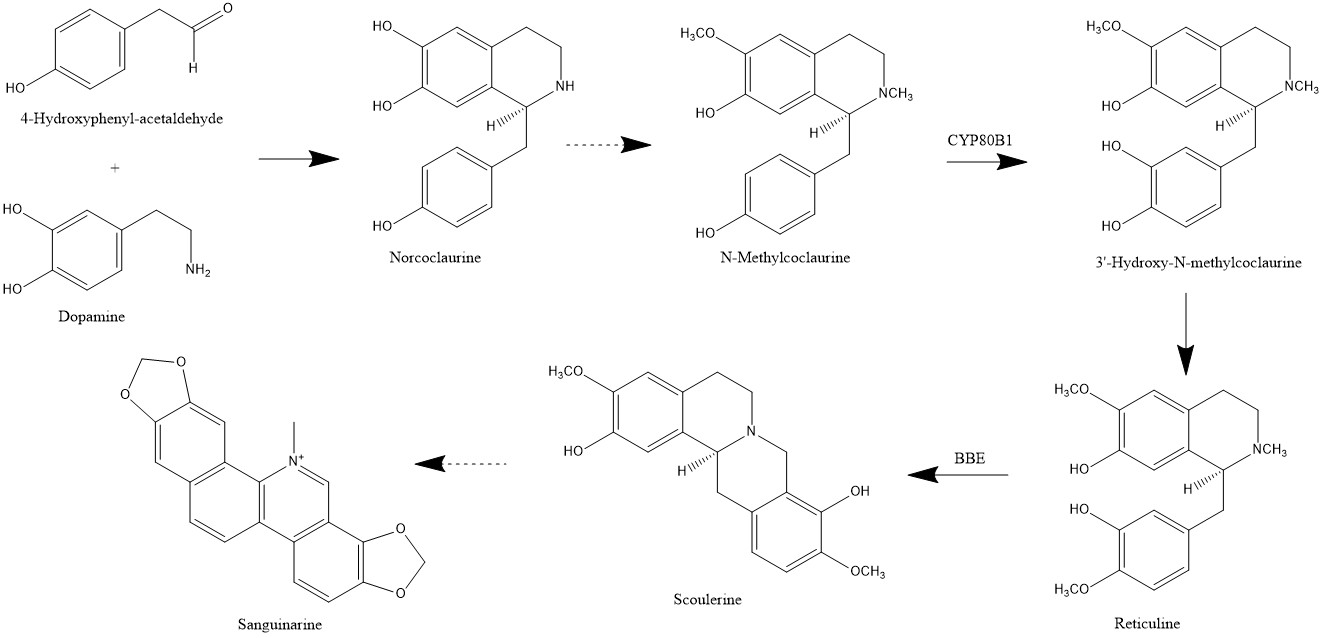
The biosynthesis of sanguinarine

== See also ==
- Berberine, a plant-derived compound having a chemical classification similar to that of sanguinarine.
- Chelidonine
