= Dihydrosanguinarine =

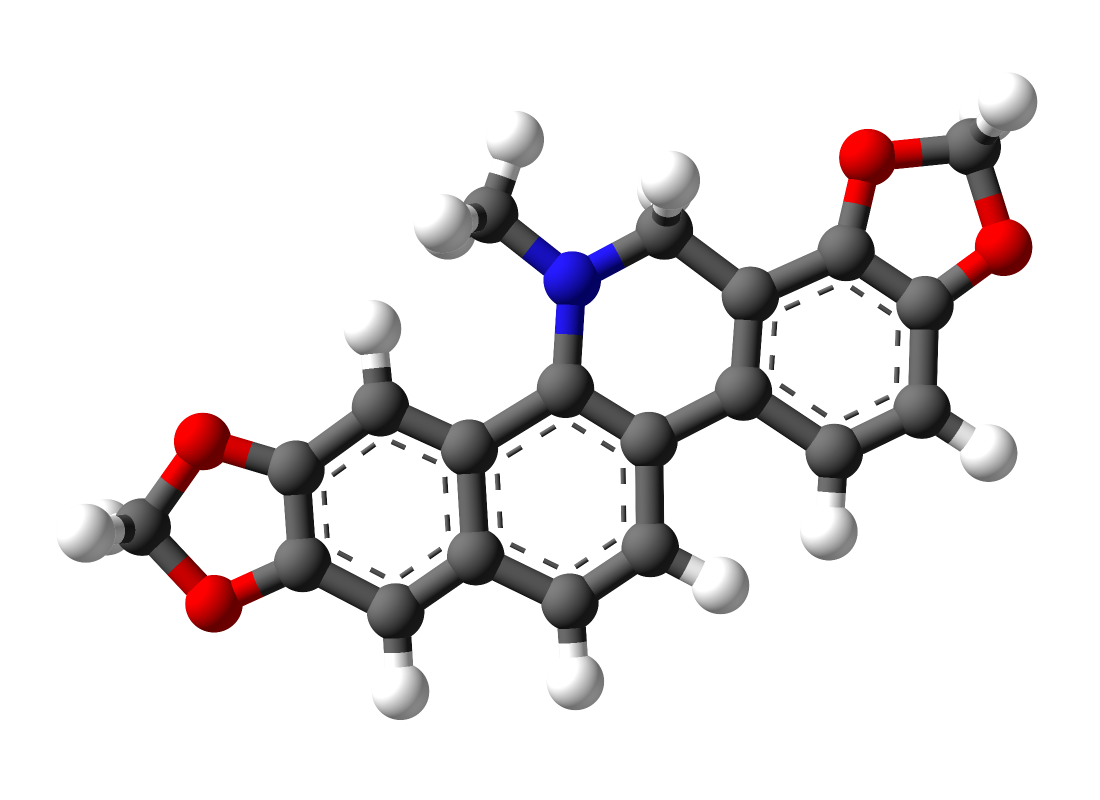

Names
- Preferred IUPAC name 13-Methyl-13,14-dihydro-2H,10H-[1,3]benzodioxolo[5,6-c][1,3]dioxolo[4,5-i]phenanthridine

Identifiers
CAS Number	3606-45-9
3D model (JSmol)	Interactive image
ChEBI	CHEBI:17209
ChEMBL	ChEMBL465678
ChemSpider	110567
KEGG	C05191
PubChem CID	124069
UNII	3H1ZKG80F7
CompTox Dashboard (EPA)	DTXSID00189627
- InChI: InChI=1S/C20H15NO4/c1-21-8-15-12(4-5-16-20(15)25-10-22-16)13-3-2-11-6-17-18(24-9-23-17)7-14(11)19(13)21/h2-7H,8-10H2,1H3 Key: CIUHLXZTZWTVFL-UHFFFAOYSA-N
- SMILES: CN1CC2=C(C=CC3=C2OCO3)C4=C1C5=CC6=C(C=C5C=C4)OCO6

Properties
Chemical formula	C_{20}H_{15}NO_{4}
Molar mass	333.343 g·mol^{−1}
- Except where otherwise noted, data are given for materials in their standard state (at 25 °C [77 °F], 100 kPa). Infobox references

Dihydrosanguinarine is an alkaloid found in the herbs Corydalis adunca and Lamprocapnos spectabilis. It gets its name from the Sanguinaria canadensis plant in the poppy family Papaveraceae in which it is also found.

== Biosynthesis ==
Dihydrosanguinarine is a benzylisoquinoline alkaloid produced in plants from the amino acid tyrosine. A sequence of enzyme-catalysed reactions gives (S)-norcoclaurine which goes through three further transformations to yield (S)-3'-hydroxy-N-methylcoclaurine. (S)-reticuline is made when the enzyme 3'-hydroxy-N-methyl-(S)-coclaurine 4'-O-methyltransferase adds a methyl group. Reticuline is a branch point in the biosynthesis: the (R) enantiomer is used to eventually produce morphine, for example in the opium poppy Papaver somniferum while other pathways use the initially-formed (S) isomer leading to sanguinarine via dihydrosanguinarine.

The immediate precursor to dihydrosanguinarine is protopine, which is oxidised by protopine 6-monooxygenase to 6-hydroxyprotopine,

Protopine

+ NADPH
O_{2}
H_{2}O

6-hydroxyprotopine

+ NADP^{+}

a compound which spontaneously forms dihydrosanguinarine.

Spontaneous conversion of 6-hydroxyprotopine to dihydrosanguinarine

The last step in the sequence from dihydrosanguinarine to sanguinarine is catalysed by the enzyme dihydrobenzophenanthridine oxidase:

dihydrosanguinarine

+ H_{2}O
O_{2}
H_{2}O_{2}

sanguinarine

== See also ==
- Dihydrosanguinarine 10-monooxygenase
- Epidemic dropsy
