= Dihydrobenzophenanthridine oxidase =

Class of enzymes

Identifiers
- EC no.: 1.5.3.12
- CAS no.: 114051-83-1

Databases
- BRENDA: enzyme data
- ExPASy: NiceZyme view
- KEGG: enzyme entry
- MetaCyc: metabolic pathway
- Rhea: reactions
- PDB structures: RCSB PDB PDBe PDBsum
- Gene Ontology: AmiGO / QuickGO
Search
- PMC: articles
- PubMed: articles
- NCBI: proteins

Dihydrobenzophenanthridine oxidase (DHBP oxidase) is an enzyme. In the IUBMB Enzyme Nomenclature, dihydrobenzophenanthridine oxidase is EC 1.5.3.12.

Dihydrobenzophenanthridine oxidase produces oxidized forms of benzophenanthridine alkaloids:

- In Sanguinaria canadensis (bloodroot), dihydrobenzophenanthridine oxidase produces sanguinarine from dihydrosanguinarine, and chelirubine from dihydrochelirubine.

dihydrosanguinarine

+ H_{2}O
O_{2}
H_{2}O_{2}

sanguinarine

- In Eschscholzia californica (California poppy), dihydrobenzophenanthridine oxidase produces macarpine from dihydromacarpine.
