= Allocryptopine =

Names
- Preferred IUPAC name 3,4-Dimethoxy-6-methyl-5,7,8,15-tetrahydro-11H-[1,3]benzodioxolo[5,6-e][2]benzazecin-14(6H)-one
- Other names Thalictrimine; allo-Cryptopine; α-Fagarine; Fagarine I; α-Allocryptopine; β-Homochelidonine

Identifiers
CAS Number	485-91-6
3D model (JSmol)	Interactive image
ChEBI	CHEBI:17390
ChemSpider	89017
ECHA InfoCard	100.006.933
EC Number	207-626-5
KEGG	C02134
PubChem CID	98570
UNII	EK27J8ROYB
CompTox Dashboard (EPA)	DTXSID60871677
- InChI: InChI=1S/C21H23NO5/c1-22-7-6-14-9-19-20(27-12-26-19)10-15(14)17(23)8-13-4-5-18(24-2)21(25-3)16(13)11-22/h4-5,9-10H,6-8,11-12H2,1-3H3 Key: HYBRYAPKQCZIAE-UHFFFAOYSA-N
- SMILES: CN1CCC2=CC3=C(C=C2C(=O)CC4=C(C1)C(=C(C=C4)OC)OC)OCO3

Properties
Chemical formula	C_{21}H_{23}NO_{5}
Molar mass	369.417 g·mol^{−1}

Hazards
- Occupational safety and health (OHS/OSH)
Main hazards	H302 (100%): Harmful if swallowed, acute toxicity
- Except where otherwise noted, data are given for materials in their standard state (at 25 °C [77 °F], 100 kPa). Infobox references

Allocryptopine is a bioactive alkaloid found in plants of the Papaveraceae family, including Glaucium arabicum, Argemone mexicana, Eschscholtzia, Corydalis, Fumaria, Chelidonium, Hunnemannia fumariifolia, Eschscholzia lobbii and other Papaveraceae plants.

== See also ==
- Cryptopine
