= John Henry Pinkard =

American businessman, banker, and herb doctor

John Henry Pinkard (1865 – January 8, 1934) was a businessman, banker, and herb doctor in Roanoke, Virginia. He was also known as a spiritualist and clairvoyant. Other people considered him a practitioner of quackery and a charlatan.

== Biography ==
Pinkard was born in Franklin County, Virginia during the last year of the Civil War. "Pinkard claimed to have been born on October 5, 1866, just after Emancipation. But US Census records suggest the herbalist and land developer was born during the Civil War." Because of his family's poverty in rural Virginia during the Reconstruction, he quit school at the age of eleven to earn money for his family. By the age of fifteen, he was a supervisor of a "dirt cut" crew for the Norfolk and Western Railroad.

Pinkard lived in Pittsburgh, Pennsylvania, at the turn of the century, where he ran a confectionary shop. He lived in Philadelphia and perhaps other places for a while, but moved back to Roanoke where he spent the last 27 years of his life. "Pinkard, a tall man who wore a black coat, carried a gold-headed cane and rode in a Packard driven by a chauffeur, was married three times but had no children. He was heavily in debt when he died."

He married his first wife, Mary Alexander of South Carolina, in 1903. She died two years later of an ailment the doctors said was incurable.

He later married Hattie Saunders of Franklin County, Virginia. He married her on Halloween, 1905, when he was in his forties and she was 15 years old. Hattie subsequently divorced him five years later on charges of abandonment of family."

In 1914, he married his third wife, 22-year-old Mary Joyce from Floyd County, Virginia.

== Banking and real estate ==
Pinkard also ran three banks, mostly dealing in banking for black people. During this period of segregation before the Great Depression, it was difficult to obtain credit for black families, especially from white owned banks. Many of the banks operated for black clientele specialized in small loans, crop loans, and savings. One of these banks was the "Acorn Small Loan Company", which was licensed by the Commonwealth of Virginia in Roanoke. He evidently also ran his "Acorn" Drug store in the next building at 1018-1020 Salem Avenue.

He also was the president of the Afro-American Bank on Salem Avenue in Roanoke.

Pinkard also had extensive holdings in Florida real estate.

== Medical work ==
Although there is no evidence he ever received medical training, he called himself "Doctor", and was locally known as a "yarb doctor," a colloquial name for "herb doctor". He was also known as a "...clairvoyant, herb doctor and spiritualist." However, he was tried in 1917 for practicing medicine without a license, but was acquitted. "Dr. Pinkard was acquitted but he faced similar legal problems on one and possibly two other occasions. The Roanoke Academy of Medicine, the professional organization of white physicians, may have been involved in instigating legal action against Dr. Pinkard in at least one case."

He was able to diagnose his patient's illnesses without asking question or examination. He held a reputation as a clairvoyant as well as a physician among his thousands of black and white patients.

By 1919 it was reported that he had both black and white patients in at least fifteen states, and he had sales of between $1,000.00 and $1,500.00 a week. He had a variety of potions and remedies that he prepared and sold out of his drugstore and shipped across the country. Some of the names were: "Pinkard's Hydrastic Compound" (evidently made from goldenseal or Hydrastis canadensis), "Pinkard's Great Liniment" and "Pinkard's Sanguinaria Compound". Some of Pinkard's Sanguinaria Compound, made from bloodroot or bloodwort, was seized by federal officials in 1931 for violating the Food and Drug Act. He pleaded guilty and was fined $25.00. Many of his concoctions were based on slave medicine, traditional rural Virginian medical practices, and Native American herb lore.

== Pinkard Court ==
During the 1920s, he developed "Pinkard Court", a housing area expressly for black people in segregated Roanoke. It was based on 25 acres of land he purchased on the National Highway, about a mile outside of Roanoke. He also built and equipped the Pinkard Court Filling Station and Tourist Camp.

In a retrospective, the Roanoke Times published a black and white photo by staff photographer Wayne Scarberry on September 12, 2017, showing a section of Pinkard Court. The caption reads: "Resident Dennis Phelps walks along the unpaved surface of Pinkard Avenue in the Pinkard Court development on March 6, 1984."

Pinkard Court School was a one level circular building built for black students. When segregation was no longer lawful, it was converted to a special education school for the county.

Near the entrance to Pinkard's Court, he built his own home. In 1972, many years after his death, the home was sold to White House Galleries. Many people claimed the house was haunted by the patients the doctor had treated unsuccessfully. Although there has never been any evidence, local lore says he had buried the dead patients in his basement. Pinkard had built a fence out of the ceramic jugs that had once held his potions, and when the wind blew over the mouths of these jugs, the eerie wailing sounds scared neighbor children, and some adults. Other people reported seeing figures suddenly appear in the gallery and then who would disappear suddenly. The Pinkard house was demolished in 1999.

== Death and burial ==
He died of tuberculosis (however, his death certificate indicates he died of liver cancer) in 1934, and is buried in an unmarked grave at the Byrdview Cemetery in Franklin County, Virginia. He was a lifelong member of the Bethel AME church in Rocky Mount, Virginia.

== Bibliography ==
- Blankenship, Michael E. Dr. John Henry Pinkard: African American Legend of Franklin County and the Roanoke Valley. Rocky Mount, Virginia: Franklin County Historical Society, 2015. http://www.worldcat.org/oclc/922012345
- Blankenship, Michael E. 2006. "John Henry Pinkard and the African-American Banks of Roanoke". Journal of the History Museum and Historical Society of Western Virginia. 16, no. 2: 46-50. Notes: Roanoke’s legendary herbal doctor, John Henry Pinkard, left some 50 business journals, revealing his role in founding the Afro-American Bank on August 1, 1921. http://www.worldcat.org/oclc/862976376
- Blankenship, Michael. Dr. John Henry Pinkard: African American Legend of the Roanoke Valley : an Exhibit Honoring the Life and Career of Dr. Pinkard. Roanoke, VA: Harrison Museum of African American Culture, 2006. http://www.worldcat.org/oclc/465226413
- Dew, W. D., and Andrew J. Oliver. Biographical Sketch of the Life, Work and Medical Skill of Dr. John Henry Pinkard, Roanoke, Virginia. [Roanoke, Va.]: [publisher not identified], 1920. by W.D. Dew, D.D., Ph. D and Andrew J. Oliver, Attorney at Law. http://www.worldcat.org/oclc/26297364
- "Dr. John Henry Pinkard." Roanoke Times. Discover History & Heritage: Exploring the People and Places of Southwest Virginia. 2015. Issue 3 originally published with the copyrighted February 25, 2016 edition of The Roanoke Times. Page 57.
- Jones, G. Robert. Dr. John H. Pinkard: A Negro Medical Genius. Suffolk, Va: The Stone Printing and MFG. Co, 1920. http://www.worldcat.org/oclc/83164243
- "John H. Pinkard Dies at Home on Rocky Mount Road." Roanoke Times. January 8, 1934. Page 20. Obituary.
- "Recalling the Yarb Doctor". By Kevin Kittredge. Roanoke Times. July 18, 2006.
