= Cryptopine =

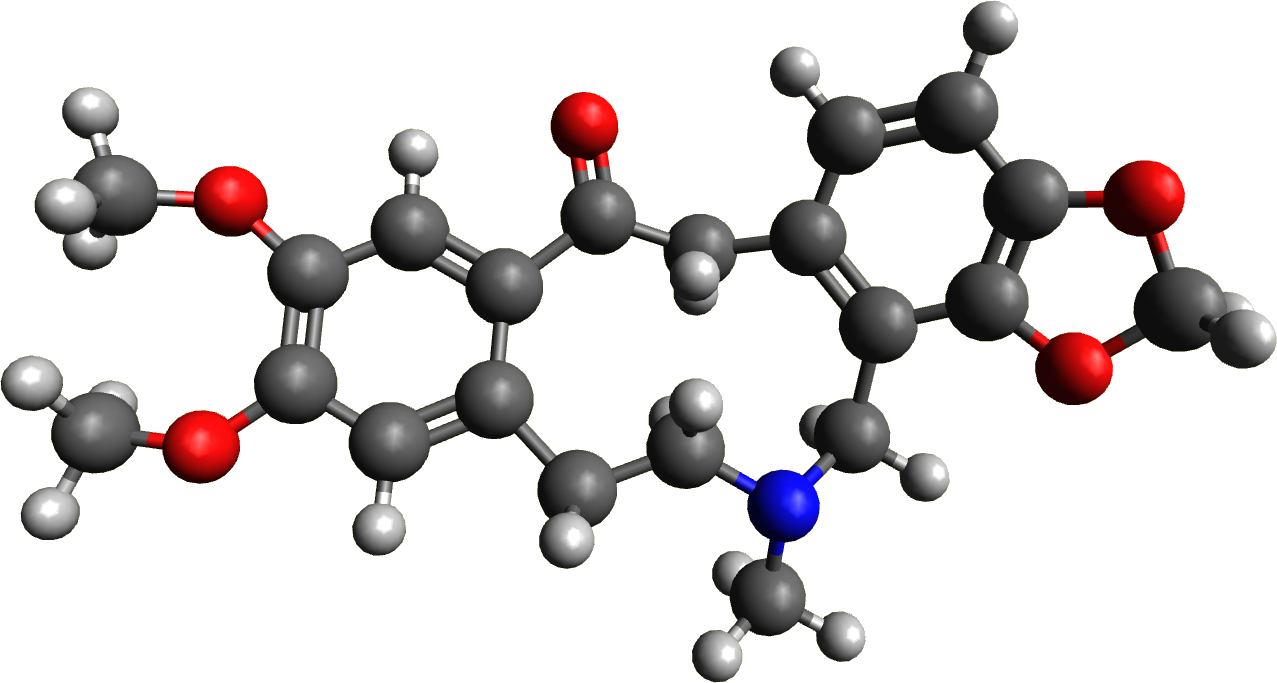

Names
- Preferred IUPAC name 9,10-Dimethoxy-5-methyl-4,6,7,13-tetrahydro-2H-benzo[e][1,3]dioxolo[4,5-l][2]benzazecin-12(5H)-one

Identifiers
CAS Number	482-74-6
3D model (JSmol)	Interactive image
ChEMBL	ChEMBL1339015
ChemSpider	65491
ECHA InfoCard	100.006.896
PubChem CID	72616
UNII	MW13X5YK4A
CompTox Dashboard (EPA)	DTXSID40197463
- InChI: InChI=1S/C21H23NO5/c1-22-7-6-14-9-19(24-2)20(25-3)10-15(14)17(23)8-13-4-5-18-21(16(13)11-22)27-12-26-18/h4-5,9-10H,6-8,11-12H2,1-3H3 Key: XPOJSWHIKCNLEQ-UHFFFAOYSA-N; InChI=1/C21H23NO5/c1-22-7-6-14-9-19(24-2)20(25-3)10-15(14)17(23)8-13-4-5-18-21(16(13)11-22)27-12-26-18/h4-5,9-10H,6-8,11-12H2,1-3H3 Key: XPOJSWHIKCNLEQ-UHFFFAOYAD
- SMILES: CN1CCc2cc(c(cc2C(=O)Cc3ccc4c(c3C1)OCO4)OC)OC

Properties
Chemical formula	C_{21}H_{23}NO_{5}
Molar mass	369.411
- Except where otherwise noted, data are given for materials in their standard state (at 25 °C [77 °F], 100 kPa). Infobox references

Cryptopine is an opium alkaloid. It is found in plants in the family Papaveraceae, including Argemone mexicana.

== See also ==
- Allocryptopine
- Protopine
