= Dermatologic surgical procedure =

Skin surgery

Dermatologic surgical procedures
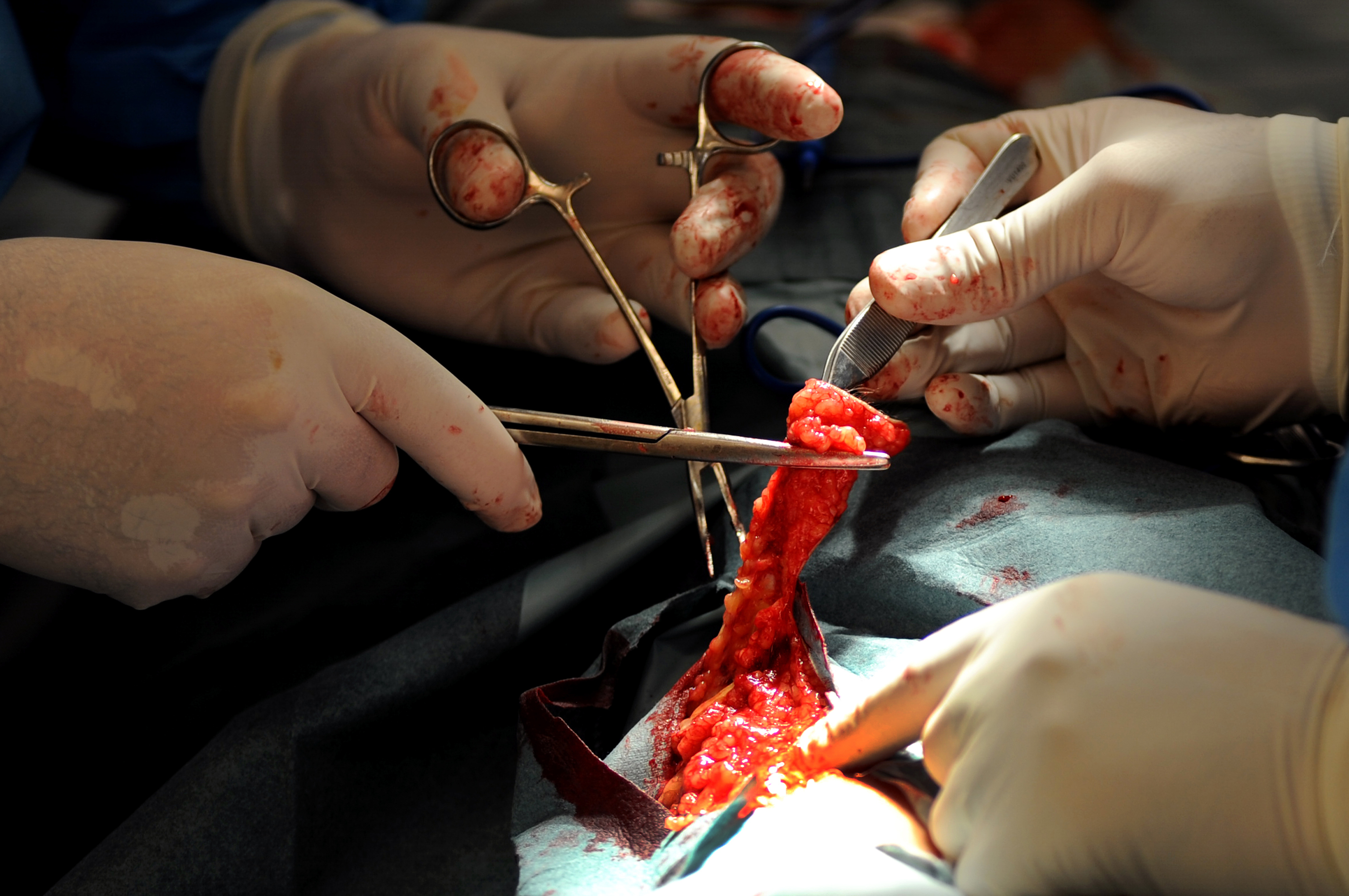
- Skin grafting for a patient suffering from severe burns
- Other names: Cutaneous surgery, dermatologic surgery, skin surgery
- Specialty: Dermatology
- Uses: Medically necessary procedures, cosmetic procedures
- MeSH: D062109

Dermatologic surgical procedures are treatments aimed at managing a wide range of medically necessary and cosmetic conditions, with a long history dating back to ancient times.

Medically necessary dermatologic surgical procedures include curettage and electrosurgery, and Mohs surgery for the treatment of skin cancer, as well as skin grafting for repairing damaged skin. Cosmetic dermatologic surgeries comprise anti-ageing procedures, and mole and scar removal surgeries. The former include Botulinum toxin treatments and face lifts, while the latter include shave excision and dermabrasion.

Although all dermatologic surgical procedures require post-operative treatment and present common risks and complications, the future development of dermatologic surgical procedures involving the use of technology shows promising improvements in patient outcomes.

== History ==
Dermatologic surgery has a long history and has evolved significantly over time. Ancient civilizations such as Egyptians, Greeks, and Romans practiced early forms of dermatologic surgery, employing techniques such as tissue excision, cautery, and scarification for therapeutic and cosmetic purposes.

The 19th century marked the emergence of dermatologic surgery as a distinct speciality, where significant advancements in surgical techniques and instruments were made. For instance, the development of aseptic techniques and anesthesia allowed for infection-free and pain-free procedures respectively, while instruments such as forceps, retractors, and cauteries improved the precision and safety of dermatological surgical procedures. The applications and safety of sutures were also enhanced by William Stewart Halsted, as he emphasized on the role of sutures in sterile tissue closure, managing hemorrhage and wound healing.

In the early 20th century, electrosurgery and cryosurgery were introduced, and surgical techniques continued to evolve from mid to late 20th century, with the introduction of surgical procedures such as skin grafting, laser surgery and Mohs microscopic surgery. The establishment of dermatology surgery societies and training programs, such as the "American College of Mohs Surgery" founded by Frederic Mohs in 1967, as well as postgraduate courses on dermabrasion and chemical peels, also contributed to the progression of surgical techniques. These advancements expanded the range of treatment options available in dermatologic surgery.

== Medically necessary procedures ==
=== Skin cancer surgery ===
Skin cancer is the uncontrolled proliferation of abnormal skin cells, usually developing on skin exposed to ultraviolet radiation. Squamous cell carcinoma, basal cell carcinoma, and melanoma are the three main types of skin cancer, with the former two being non-melanoma skin cancer.

==== Curettage and Electrosurgery ====
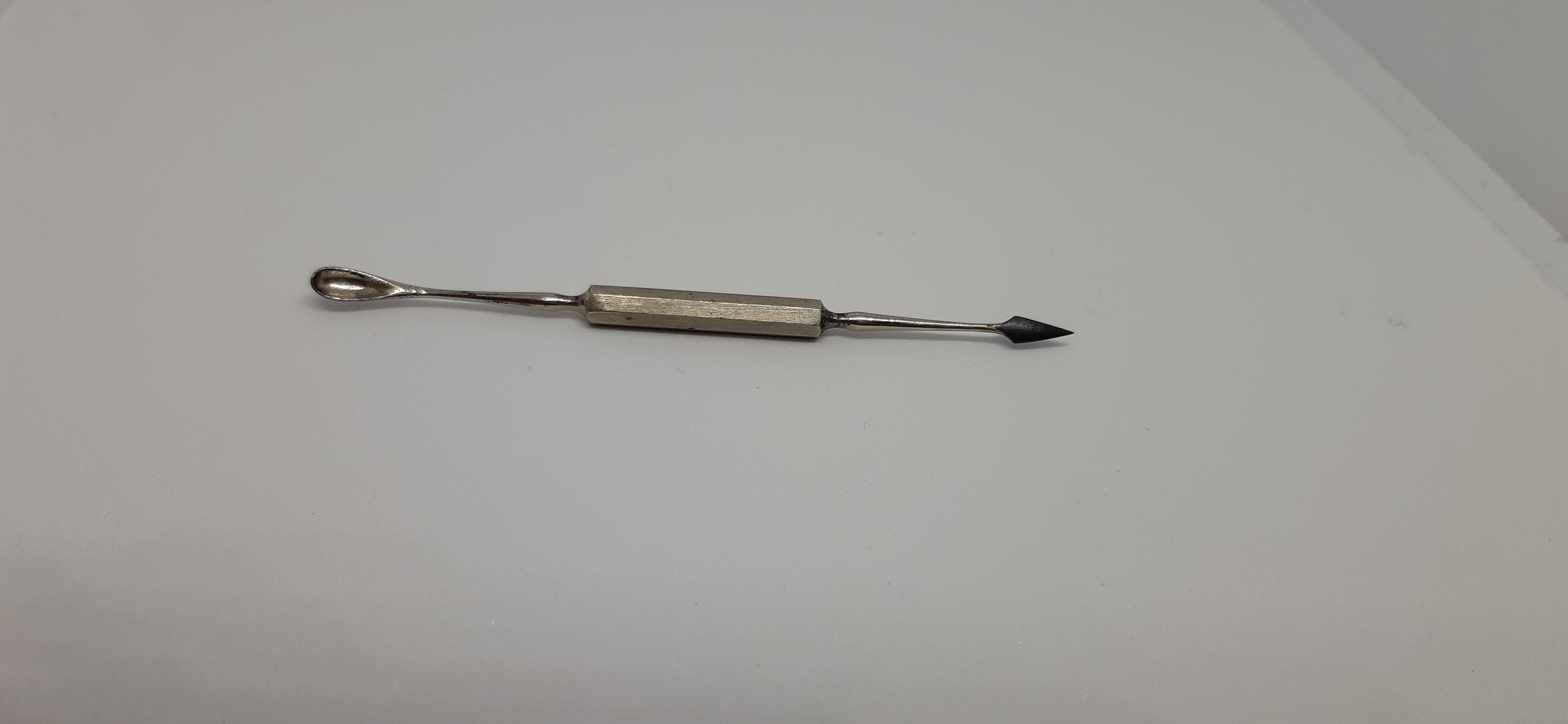
A scoop-shaped curette used in dermatologic surgeries

Most small, low-risk and superficial skin cancers, such as basal cell carcinoma and squamous cell carcinoma, could be treated by curettage and electrosurgery. A clinical margin which includes areas around the lesion site is marked out, and local anesthesia or numbing medicine is applied. A curette, consisting of a fenestrated head with a semi-sharp blade, is used to debride the malignant tumour. This is done by mechanically scraping or peeling at the lesion until all cancerous tissues are removed. Electrodesiccation is followed up after each curettage by applying a high-voltage electric current to the tumour site. The heat could destroy the remaining tumours not eliminated by curettage, induce inflammatory response in tumour cells, and aid in hemostasis. Treating small and superficial skin cancers with curettage and electrosurgery presents a high cure rate of over 90%.

==== Mohs Surgery ====
Mohs surgery could target non-melanoma and melanoma skin cancers, and is recommended as a first-line treatment for large, high-risk tumours in anatomically critical areas. After local anesthesia is applied, visible tumours are first excised using a scalpel. Then, a thin piece of tissue is removed circumferentially around the tumour and sectioned with a cryostat microtome. This is followed by tissue processing and viewing under a microscope. If any residual tumour could be identified microscopically, the tumour site could be marked for further tissue removal. This process is repeated until the absence of tumours is confirmed by these histological methods. In most patients treated with Mohs surgery, complete elimination of cancerous cells, maximal conservation of healthy tissues, and high cure rates of up to 99% are observed.

=== Skin grafts ===
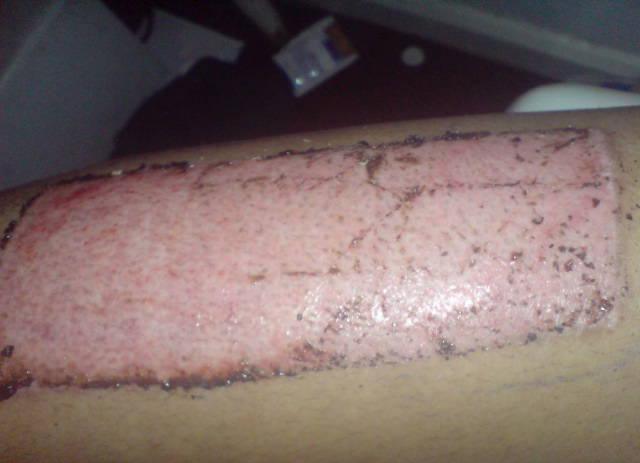
Donor site 8 days after a skin graft

Skin grafting is a surgical procedure where a piece of healthy skin, also known as the donor site, is taken from one body part and transplanted to another, often to cover damaged or missing skin. Before surgery, the location of the donor site would be determined, and patients would undergo anesthesia.

==== Full-Thickness Skin Grafts (FTSG) ====
FTSGs are the most frequently used grafts in dermatology, which involves surgical removal of the epidermis and dermis layers of the skin. After the skin graft is harvested, the donor site is stitched close, and the graft is trimmed of any underlying hair or fat tissue, as well as contoured to match the size and shape of the defect. The graft is then immediately placed onto the wound site and sutured. Finally, a bolster, which is a type of dressing, is placed over the graft to secure it in place.

==== Split-Thickness Skin Grafts (STSG) ====
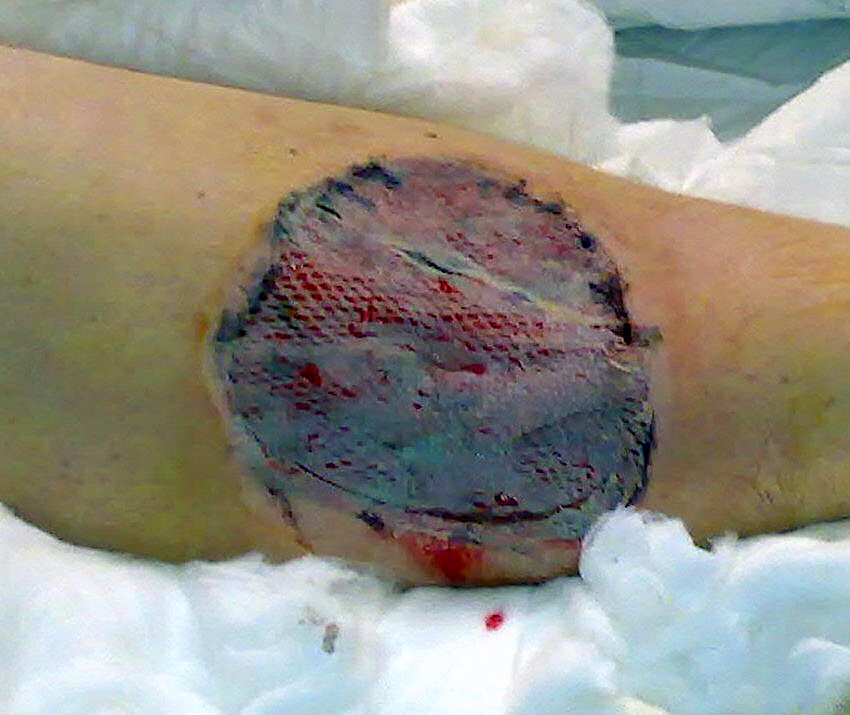
Skin graft with vacuum-assisted wound closure after 5 days

STSGs are suitable for large wounds and relatively avascular sites where FTSGs would have a high risk of failure. Only a portion of the skin, namely the epidermis and part of the dermis, is removed from the donor site using a powered dermatome. If desired, meshing of the harvested skin graft allows it to be elongated. The graft is then applied to the defect and secured using skin staples or dissolvable sutures. A bolster is placed over the graft to conclude the procedure, while for areas where bolstering is difficult, a negative pressure wound vacuum could reduce air pressure on the wound to promote healing.

==== Composite Grafts ====
Composite grafts are used to repair defects that require contouring and support due to a loss of underlying muscle or bone. These grafts usually consist of different tissue layers, such as the skin, cartilage, and fat, and are frequently utilized to reconstruct structures such as the nose, ears, and fingertips. Skin from the donor site is first excised precisely and contoured as needed, then the donor site is closed in multiple layers. The graft is subsequently placed over the wound and secured by suturing, followed by the application of a bolster if necessary. Typically, minor revisions of the graft are required after the initial surgery for fine-tuning and adjustment of the graft's shape and appearance.

== Cosmetic procedures ==
=== Anti-ageing procedures ===
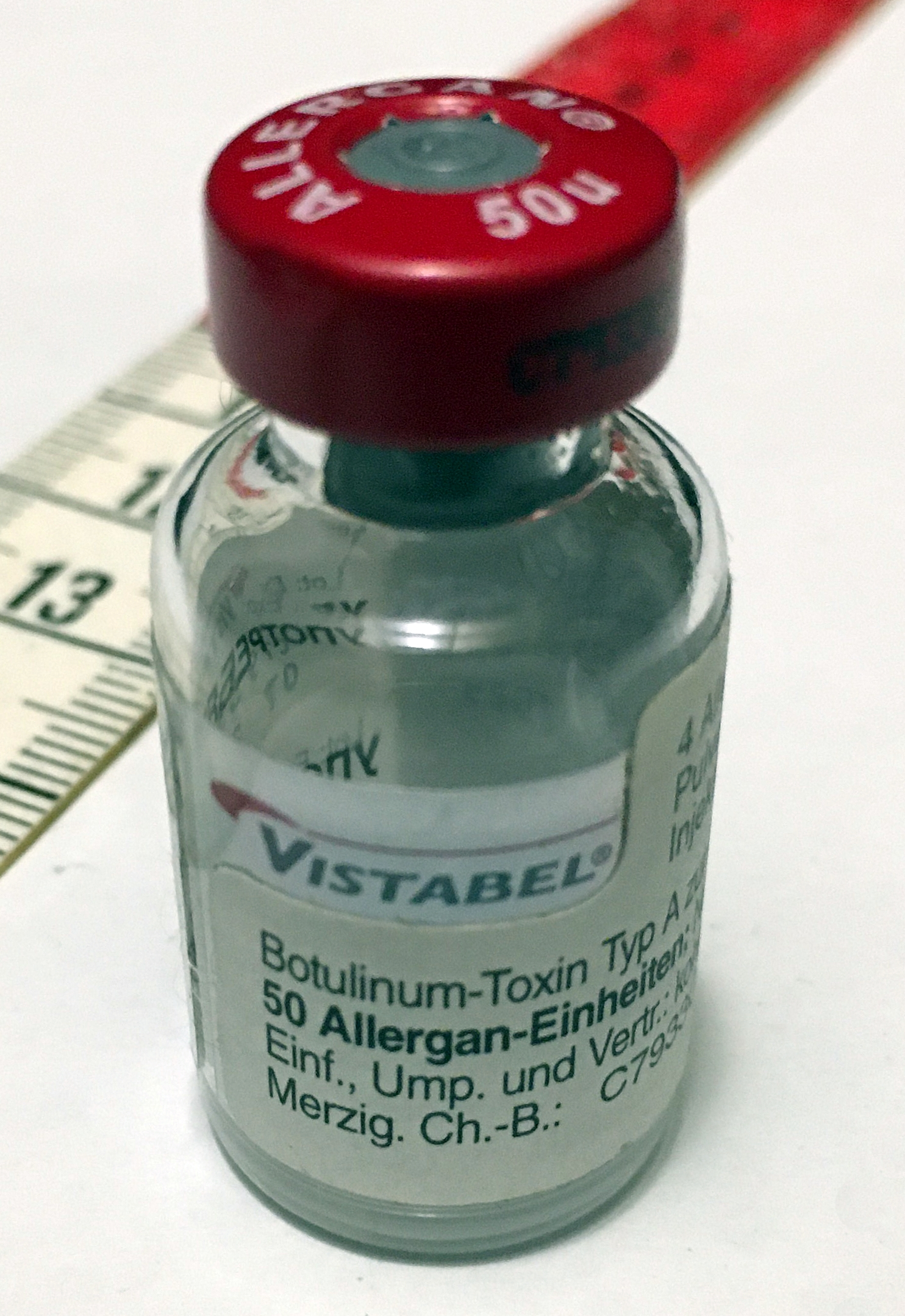
Botulinum toxin type A used for cosmetic purposes

==== Botulinum toxin treatments ====
Botulinum toxin is a neurotoxin with cosmetic and dermatologic applications, such as treating hyperhidrosis, removing facial lines and wrinkles. Among the serotypes A to G, Botulinum toxin type A is the major type used for aesthetic and clinical purposes. Before injection, it has to be reconstituted using sterile saline as a diluent. The reconstituted solution should be refrigerated and used within 4 hours to prevent its loss of function. Then, by using a hollow teflon-coated, 30-gauge 1-inch needle, the toxin could be injected directly into the affected muscles. The dose of toxin for each injection is determined by the muscle mass, while the injection site should be localized to overactive smooth muscles to induce muscle weakness. Overactive muscles can be determined by measuring the muscle's maximal response to a nervous stimuli with electromyography. Botulinum toxin could be used to relax the corrugator and procerus muscles, orbicularis oculi, and the frontalis muscle to relieve glabellar lines (frown lines), lateral canthal lines (Crow's feet) and forehead lines respectively.

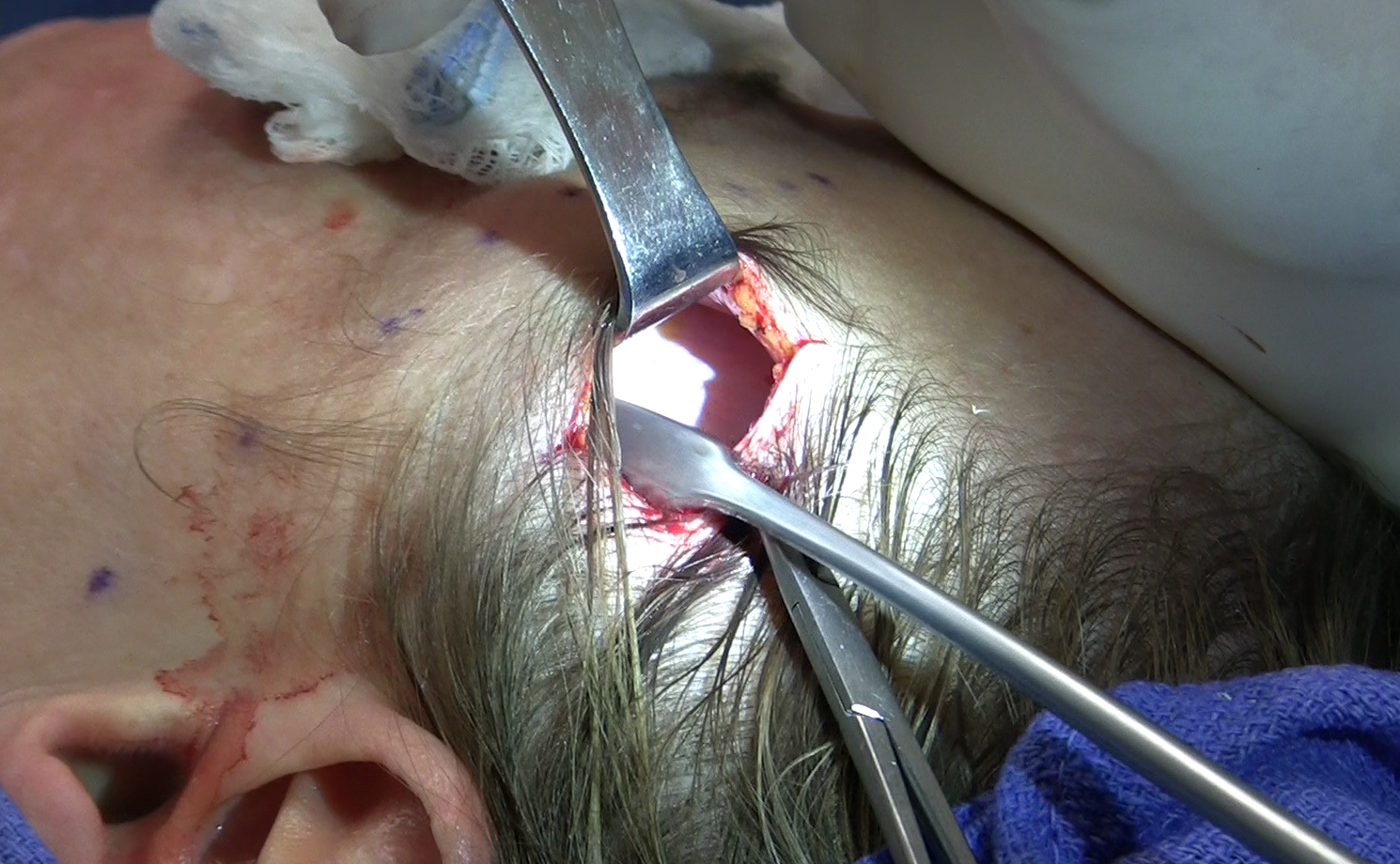
Face lift (Rhytidectomy) with temporal incision behind the hairline

==== Face lift (Rhytidectomy) ====
Rhytidectomy is a surgical method, often used for making the skin look smoother and younger. This is done by first making an incision at the temples that extend around the ear, then separating the skin from the underlying fascial layers and muscles, and removing the sagging facial skin. The remaining skin is subsequently pulled backward and upward, and sutured to a new position to achieve a tightened appearance. During this process, facial muscles might be tightened, while facial fat might be removed or redistributed. Sometimes, a jaw lift is performed in the same surgery by making an incision under the chin and tightening the skin of the jaw and neck. Immediately after the surgery, a drainage tube is used to remove excess fluid from the wound.

=== Mole and scar removal surgeries ===
==== Shave excision ====
Mole removal surgeries are performed for various reasons. Atypical mole removal is performed when moles look dysplastic, as this is associated with an increased risk of melanoma; Cosmetic mole removal is performed when moles are non-cancerous, but are preferred to be eliminated due to aesthetic or practical considerations.

Shave excision is the most frequently used method for mole removal. Anesthesia is first administered to the area around the mole. With the use of a sharp razor, multiple horizontal cuts are then made to remove the mole. This is followed by electrosurgical feathering, where a small dermal loop electrode is used to gently shape the edges of the wound. This not only ensures any remaining cells of the mole are removed, but also minimizes scarring as the edges of the wound are blended with the surrounding skin. At last, the surgical site is cleaned, applied with antibiotic ointment, and covered with a sterile bandage to prevent infection.

==== Dermabrasion ====
Scar revisions are cosmetic treatments to improve the appearance of scars, with dermabrasion being a surgical procedure most often used for individuals with skin concerns such as scars caused by acne, surgery or injury. This skin-resurfacing procedure makes use of dermabraders, a rapidly rotating device to exfoliate the outer layer of the skin, thereby promoting the growth of new skin that is smoother in texture.

First, local or general anesthesia is employed. Next, the area to be treated is marked out, and a suitable dermabrasion tip is chosen to be used during the procedure. During dermabrasion, the skin being treated is held taut with one hand to maintain tension while the dermabrader is moved across the skin uniformly and gently. Proper manipulation, appropriate pressure and precise control of the dermabrader is crucial to ensure the accurate layer of the skin is targeted and to reduce adverse effects. Following dermabrasion, a saline-soaked gauze coupled with occlusive ointment are applied to the treated skin to prevent infection and facilitate wound healing.

== Post-operative treatment and recovery ==
=== Surgeries for medically necessary conditions ===
For skin cancer surgeries, most wounds are relatively small. After removal of the dressing, the wound can be cleaned by washing with clean soapy water, and should be kept moist. It is also suggested to apply prescribed antibiotic ointments or any other medications to the wound, and protect the scar formed.

For skin grafts, the newly grafted skin is fragile to damage. Slight bleeding may occur, which can be managed by removing serosanguineous material or necrotic debris using hydrogen peroxide. If eschar is present which affects the grafted skin, debridement should only be done when the area of necrosis is clearly defined.

=== Surgeries for cosmetic conditions ===
Immediately after a dermatologic cosmetic surgery, it is generally recommended for the surgical site to be elevated to reduce swelling and maintain blood flow. Analgesics, antibiotics and anesthetics are usually prescribed to relieve pain, inflammation and swelling. Patients should refrain from vigorous exercise for the first few days after surgery and exercise caution when gradually resuming their normal activities. Showering should also be avoided during the first few days after surgery. Patients are also advised against submerging their wound in water for at least two weeks after surgery.

== Risks and complications ==
During dermatologic surgery, dissecting errors may give rise to damaged structures adjacent to the surgical site, such as nerves, glands, and blood vessels. This may result in numbness, muscle weakness or paralysis. Patients with risk factors such as blood clotting abnormalities or long-term use of certain medications may experience excessive bleeding at the incision site. This would prolong the healing process and increase the risk of bacterial wound infection. Moreover, though uncommon, allergic reactions to anesthesia during surgery may also occur in some patients.

After dermatologic surgery, the presence of suture materials at the wound site can cause redness and swelling, yet these suture reactions may not necessarily indicate allergy or infection. Other common complications include hypertrophic or keloid scars, bruises, suture marks, and skin color changes, which may be temporary or permanent.

== Future directions ==
Throughout the past 10 years, minimally invasive dermatological procedures have shown significant advancements, with the emergence of intradermal fillers, botulinum toxin injections and chemical peels. These techniques require smaller incisions, which could lessen scarring and trauma, and decrease surgical complications. Compared with traditional surgical methods, minimally invasive procedures are more likely to result in high patient satisfaction and treatment efficacy. With the introduction of three-dimensional bioprinting and robotic-assisted surgeries for tissue repair and reconstruction, future technological advancements might continue to diminish recovery time and improve patient outcomes.

== See also ==
- Electrodesiccation and curettage
- Mohs surgery
- Skin grafting
- Botulinum toxin
- Rhytidectomy
- Dermabrasion
