= Black salve =

Ineffective and unsafe alternative medicine cancer treatment

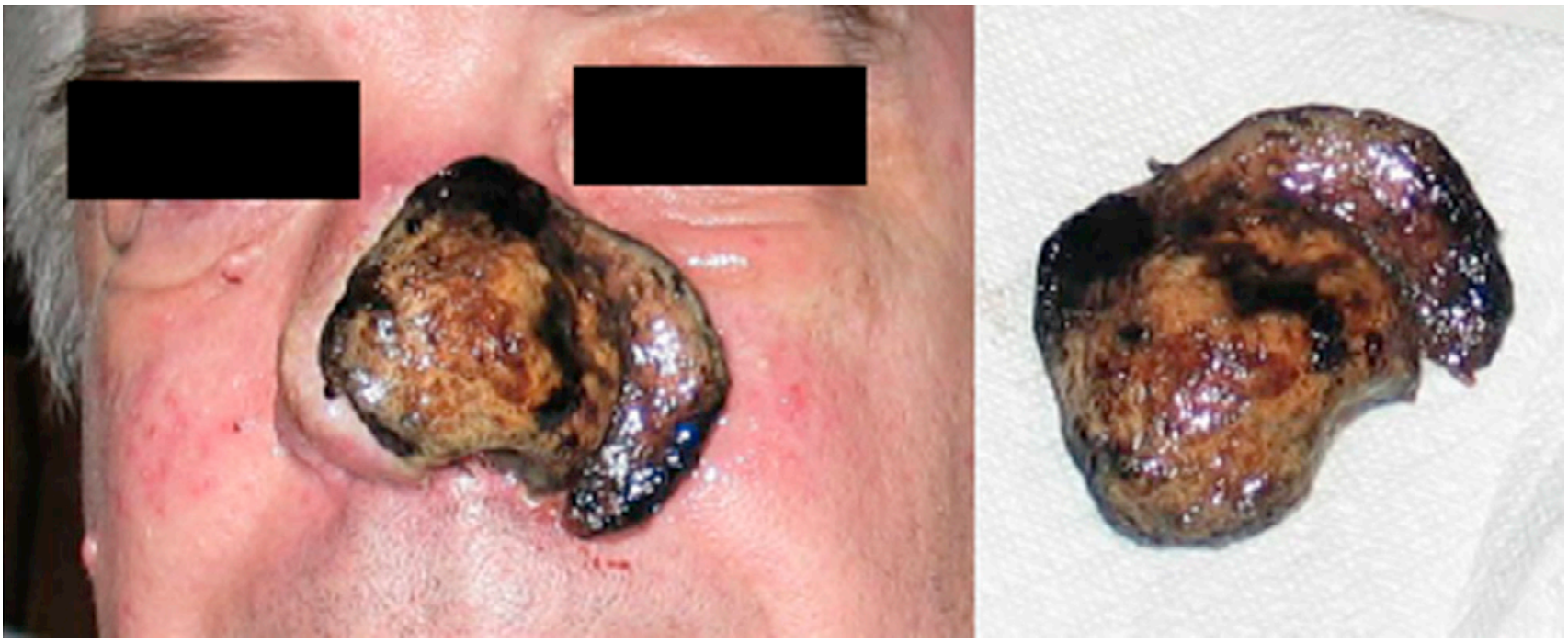
- Death of the skin of the left naris caused by use of black salve for suspected melanoma. The nose had to be amputated with an image after treatment below.

Alternative therapy
- Legality: Illegal to market for cancer in most of the world

Black salve, also known by the brand name Cansema, is an ineffective and unsafe alternative cancer treatment. The product is commonly classified as an escharotic—a topical paste which destroys skin tissue and leaves behind dead tissue called an eschar. Escharotics were widely used to treat skin lesions in the early 1900s, but have since been replaced by safer and more effective treatments. Escharotics, such as black salves, are currently advertised by some alternative medicine marketers as treatments for skin cancer, often with unsubstantiated testimonials and unsupported claims of effectiveness.

The U.S. Food and Drug Administration has listed Cansema as a "fake cancer cure" and warns consumers to avoid it. The American Academy of Dermatology urged patients to consult a dermatologist before using home remedies for skin cancers.

== History ==
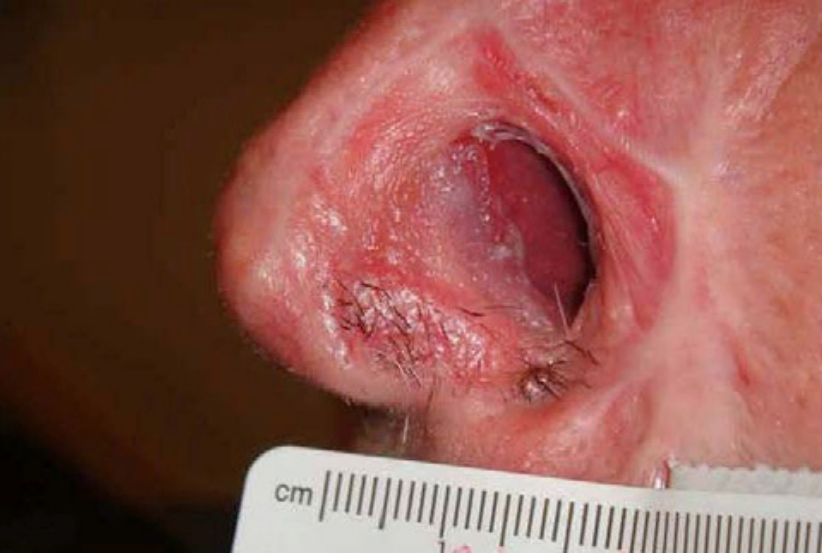
Loss of left naris after use of corrosive black salve ointment for suspected melanoma. Same patient as shown above.

Black salve probably originated with Native Americans. In 1850, its use by American surgeon, Jesse Fell, who made and sold Fells' paste, made of Sanguinaria canadensis (bloodroot) and zinc oxide. It was used as mainstream conventional medicine for some skin conditions, until more effective treatments became available. Frederic E. Mohs used it in the 1930s as an early way of fixing (preserving) tissues to study skin cancers under a microscope, which eventually led to the development of Mohs surgery. (Modern Mohs surgery normally uses a fresh–frozen tissue technique, which is quicker and less painful than caustic black salve.) At the time, he patented Mohs paste, due to his concern about the harms that would result if applied incorrectly.

As the medical profession started to gain a better understanding, many home remedies, black salve as one example, started to be criticized by medical professionals. An example of this is documented and labeled as a form of quackery in a 1955 Time magazine article:

A 37-year-old housewife had a skin condition that later (at Duke) proved not to be a cancer. Convinced that it was, she had gone to a backwoods healer, who applied a salve. Soon, a quarter-sized hole disfigured her nose, opening up the nasal cavity. Duke's plastic surgeons had to build her a new nose.

== Uses, dangers, and alternatives ==
Black salve is not recommended as treatments for skin lesions or skin cancer by medical authorities, but it is marketed by some alternative medicine practitioners. Use of escharotics, particularly when used instead of proven treatments, can be dangerous. The escharotic may not remove all of the cancerous cells, even it if appears to have burned away the visible spot, and it frequently kills healthy tissue.

Safer and more effective treatments exist for skin cancers, such as:

- cryotherapy (freezing off the cancer with liquid nitrogen);
- surgical removal, including both simple excision (95% permanent cure rate for basal-cell carcinomas) and Mohs surgery (microscopically controlled surgery used to remove the smallest possible amount of skin, while still removing all the cancer);
- topical agents such as imiquimod, fluorouracil and ingenol mebutate;
- electrodesiccation and curettage (cutting away the visible tumor and then cauterizing the wound); and
- radiation therapy.

Escharotics can cause serious scarring and damage to normal skin. The mechanism of action is "direct tissue destruction", by chemically burning any skin that it touches. If the cancerous spot is thin and completely superficial, there is a chance that this destruction of the skin will also kill the cancer; however, the more frequent result is that the cancer survives treatment with black salve, and what could have once been treated easily instead spreads.

Numerous reports in the medical literature describe serious consequences of using escharotics in place of standard treatments for skin cancer, commonly including pain, disfigurement, infections, and preventable cancer recurrences. The resulting ulcer may take up to six months to heal, or significant longer, or require surgery to repair, and the result is often discoloration, scars, and skin necrosis (holes in the skin due to the tissue dying). Additionally, there are less common complications based on the location, such burning through the skin into the large bowel, creating an enterocutaneous fistula that leaked fecal matter. Many individuals who have used black salve were unaware of its potential dangers.

Additionally, black salve is frequently ineffective, and it has worse cure and survival rates than conventional treatment. In one case series of 14 people trying black salve for basal-cell carcinoma, several were believed to be cured, but five required conventional medical treatment soon after trying black salve (the long-term outcome for the rest was unknown). In some cases, the cancer had spread very deep in the meantime, and one died. For comparison, Mohs surgery has a 99.5% permanent cure rate for BCC, and the topical cream imiquimod has an 85% success for superficial BCC.

By 2018, some people were using black salve on pet cats, dogs, and horses.

=== Death ===
In 2018, black salve was strongly linked to the death of Helen Lawson in Australia. Lawson covered her abdomen in black salve under the direction of Dennis Wayne Jensen, a self-proclaimed healer, who advised her that it would draw out her ovarian cancer. The black salve left Lawson with a mass of wounds on her abdomen, which became so large within a few weeks that surgeons could not operate on it. Lawson's sister-in-law described the wounds as extending from "above her pubic bone, all across her abdomen almost up to her rib cage", and as "raw, mutilated bubbling flesh". Lawson died in April 2018. In 2019, Jensen was issued a prohibition order by the Health Complaints Commissioner of Victoria, forbidding him permanently from providing substances which "he (or anyone else) claims can cure or treat cancer or other serious disease or illness". This includes black salve.

Other people have died because the black salve did not kill all the cancer.

== Ingredients ==
Black salve is a paste made of multiple ingredients, including both herbal and non-herbal substances. The manufacture is largely unregulated, so the ingredients, strength, and purity of marketed products are unknown and unverified. The true concentration of the products is unknown, especially for bloodroot, as the concentration of its extracts varies significantly from one plant to the next. One or more of these three ingredients are usually included:

- zinc chloride, which is an aggressive acid that burns skin and tissues;
- chaparral (also known as creosote bush); and
- bloodroot or an extract of bloodroot called sanguinarine, which is an alkaloid that destroys living tissue.

All three of these ingredients are corrosive substances. Many manufacturers also include other substances.

== Regulation ==
Several countries have recommended against using black salve.

=== Australia ===
The Therapeutic Goods Administration (TGA) of Australia advises consumers against purchasing or using black salve, red salve, or Cansema products. The TGA has found the Australian Vaccination-Skeptics Network (AVN) in breach of advertising regulations, and in a separate finding the AVN's former president Meryl Dorey together with Leon Pittard of Fair Dinkum Radio were found to be in breach.

=== United States ===
Cansema is listed by the U.S. Food and Drug Administration (FDA) as one of 187 fake cancer cures. Cansema continues to be marketed by numerous individuals, as evidenced by recent FDA Warning Letters. The FDA has taken enforcement action against illegal marketing of Cansema as a cancer cure, as in the 2004 arrest and conviction of Greg Caton.

The FDA has taken an active role in the banning of these chemicals for use as a cancer cure. Typical warning letters detail the dangers of this product while also admonishing the purveyors of their obligation to comply with federal law. Summaries of recent letters are cataloged on the FDA website.

== Marketing approach ==
Businesses that use or sell escharotics frequently provide testimonials instead of scientific evidence, to convince potential buyers of effectiveness and safety, which does not exist. One typical advertising claim is that bloodroot (or its extracts) kills cancerous cells but not healthy ones. However, this is not true, as research shows that some cancer cells are resistant to bloodroot, and that some healthy cells are easily destroyed by it. Even among the promising research, preferential tumor targeting by bloodroot extracts is seen in a narrow therapeutic window, and the lack of standardization and control over the manufacturing process makes it unlikely that anyone could achieve the exact dose in home treatment. Zinc chloride – sometimes the main ingredient by weight – is "indiscriminate", and kills any cells it touches. Despite claims from the sellers that it selectively kills only cancerous cells, black salve lacks tumour specificity.

They market it as a "natural" product, because buyers believe this appeal to nature. However, the zinc chloride used in these preparations is a synthetic industrial chemical that does not occur naturally, and some manufacturers add other synthetic chemicals.

Sellers also claim that black salve, though producing a deep black scar (eschar) initially, will not leave long-term scars. However, this is not true. The eschar sloughs off to produce an open ulcer. Scarring from this ulcer is particularly bad on parts of the body that curve outwards, e.g., the tip of the nose or the sides of the nostrils. Scarring is also worse if the wound is large, if there are more than one wound, or if it is on the face. Use on the nose can produce graphic deformities, requiring multiple reconstructive surgeries. Only a small minority of users described in the medical literature reported a fair or good cosmetic outcome.

The typical customer is hoping to avoid surgery. They are afraid that surgery might be ineffective, expensive, or produce unwanted side effects (e.g., that the surgery could result in a larger incision if the cancer is deeper than originally suspected). Most are unaware of any side effects from using black salve, such as pain, scarring, or infection. Many feel that they have trouble communicating well with a physician, and most start using black salve before consulting a healthcare provider.

Several companies sell black salve under their own brand names, such as Cansema from Alpha Omega Labs, Black Ointment from Dr. Christopher’s Original Formulas, and Herb Veil 8 from Altered States.

== See also ==
- List of ineffective cancer treatments
