= Kavita Mariwalla =

American dermatologist

- Education: Yale School of Medicine; Yale University
- Occupation: Dermatology
- Awards: ASDS President's Award 2019 Iron Surgeon ASDS
- Honours: President-elect of ASDS

Kavita Mariwalla is a dermatologist and author based on Long Island, New York. She is acknowledged as a leading scholar in skin cancer and aesthetic and medical dermatology and is the president-elect of the American Society for Dermatologic Surgery.

== Early life and education ==
Mariwalla grew up in New York and was immersed in the medical field from an early age. Both her parents were doctors: her father a gastroenterologist and her mother a pediatrician. She attended Yale University as an undergraduate and earned an MD at the Yale University School of Medicine as well. After completing a year in internal medicine at Massachusetts General Hospital, she finished her residency in dermatology at Yale, where she served as chief resident.

== Career ==
Mariwalla is a double board-certified dermatologist and Mohs surgeon and was an assistant professor at Stony Brook University. Before starting her practice in Long Island, she was the director of cutaneous oncology at St. Luke's Roosevelt and Beth Israel Medical Center in Manhattan.

Widely acknowledged as a leader in skin cancer and aesthetic and medical dermatology, Mariwalla is the author of several books, including the recent The Business of Dermatology (co-authored with Jeffrey Dover). She has published extensively in medical journals, on subjects ranging from standardized criteria for skin quality to accurately determining shades of skin color. Mariwalla is also an advocate of "cultural competency" in order to best serve diverse patients and has spoken on how practices like anti-aging may differ between different skin tones.

Mariwalla is passionate about dermatologic surgical education and is a founding member of Boards University. Boards University aims to "change the way medical education is delivered" while ensuring that "learning from leaders is accessible". During the pandemic, she founded the 21@21 initiative on social media to help educate dermatology residents and Mohs surgeons. It is still used as a resource by residents preparing for exams. Her book, Primer in Dermatologic Surgery, is also widely used by students and doctors alike.

Mariwalla has appeared on a number of prominent media outlets, including NBC New York. She has also lent her expertise to a variety of beauty magazines and publications, including Vogue and Allure, as well as serving on the Byrdie Beauty & Wellness Board. Her efforts to maintain her dermatology practice during the Covid pandemic have been reported in magazines including Bizwomen. Her emphasis for women to care for their skin has been reported by CBS.

== Honors and awards ==
Mariwalla is a three-time recipient of the American Society for Dermatologic Surgery (ASDS) President's Award. She was given the title of "Iron Surgeon" at the 2019 ASDS meeting.

Mariwalla is the president-elect of ASDS and has served on the Board of Directors of the Women's Dermatologic Society.

== Personal life ==
Mariwalla resides in New York with her three sons and her husband Kabir.
