= American College of Mohs Surgery =

- Company type: Non-profit
- Industry: Skin cancer, Mohs surgery
- Founded: 1967
- Founder: Frederic E. Mohs
- Headquarters: Milwaukee, Wisconsin
- Key people: Howard W. Rogers, Board President (2022–2023)
- Website: www.mohscollege.org

The American College of Mohs Surgery (abbreviated as ACMS) is a membership-based organization of surgeons who are fellowship-trained (FACMS) in Mohs surgery, a technique that removes skin cancer in stages, one tissue layer at a time. The ACMS is the oldest and largest professional membership organization for Mohs surgeons.

== History ==
The American College of Mohs Surgery was established in 1967 by Frederic E. Mohs, a general surgeon based at the University of Wisconsin – Madison. In addition to founding the college, Dr. Mohs also served as its first president.

Members of the American College of Mohs Surgery have completed an extensive fellowship of at least one full year of hands-on training in the Mohs procedure under the supervision of a highly qualified instructor.

In 1995, an ancillary group called The American Society for Mohs Histotechnology was founded. The organization is composed of more than 375 non-physician laboratory technicians who process the slides evaluated during a Mohs procedure.

== Purpose ==
The purpose of the ACMS is to "promote and advance high standards of patient care" with respect to Mohs surgery and other forms of cutaneous oncology through fellowship training, research, education, and public advocacy. It offers professional recognition to physicians proficient in Mohs surgery. The ACMS also offers opportunities for continuing education, as well as an annual meeting with speakers and industry exhibitors. The ACMS aims to "improve the clinical and aesthetic outcomes of Mohs surgery" by requiring physicians to undergo a rigorous fellowship training process as well as ongoing education. The ACMS also allows patients to access information and locate credentialed physicians in the United States and abroad.
