= Mohs surgery =

Surgery used to treat skin cancers

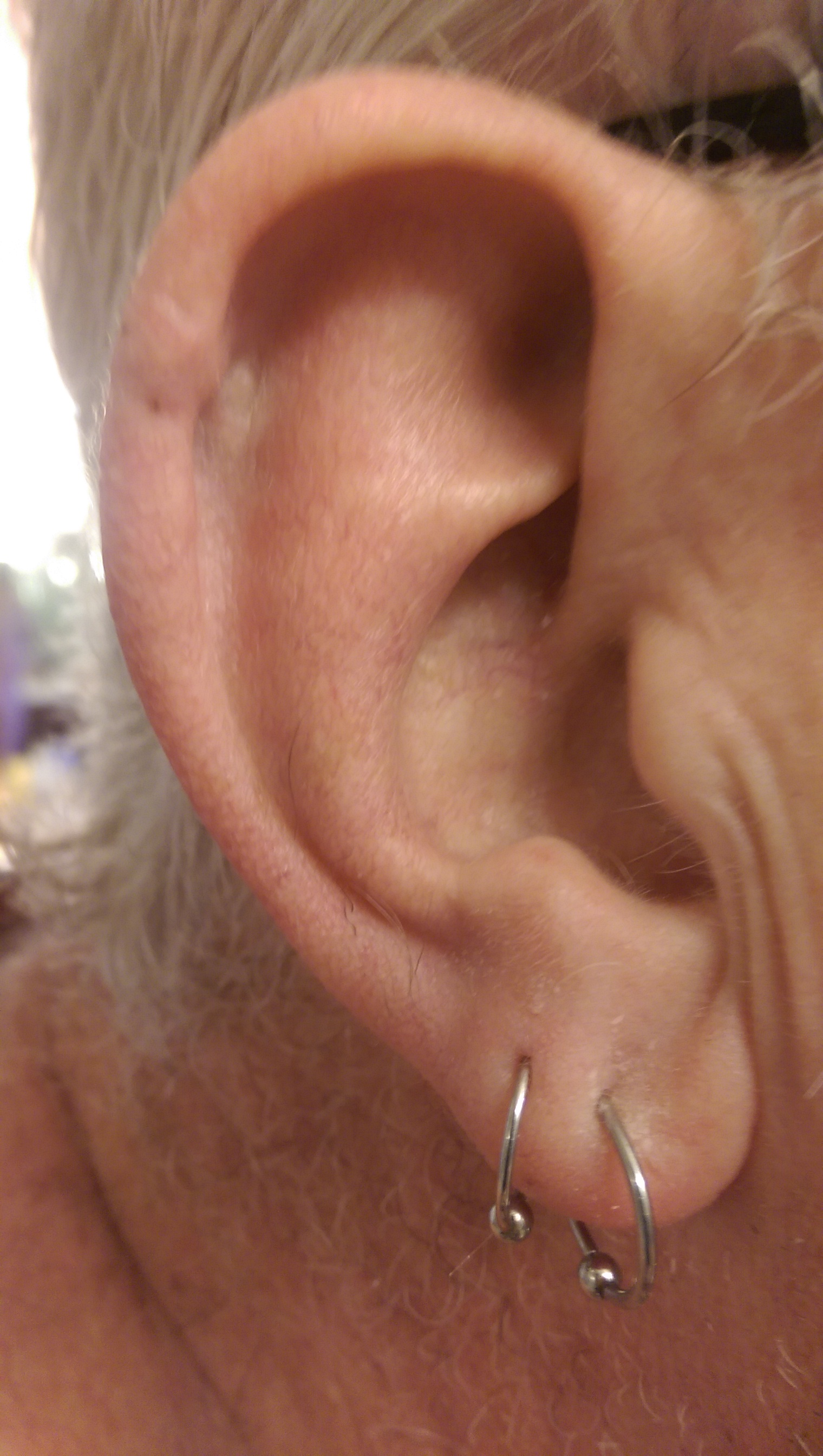
- The ear of a 63-year-old man, photographed sixteen days after Mohs surgery to remove a squamous cell carcinoma on the left upper edge of the ear, and three days after removal of the sutures
- MeSH: D015580

Mohs surgery, developed in 1938 by general surgeon Frederic E. Mohs, is microscopically controlled surgery used to treat both common and rare types of skin cancer. During the surgery, after each removal of tissue and while the patient waits, the tissue is examined for cancer cells. That examination dictates the decision for additional tissue removal. Mohs surgery is the gold standard method for obtaining complete margin control during removal of a skin cancer (complete circumferential peripheral and deep margin assessment using frozen section histology). This method allows for the removal of skin cancer with a very narrow surgical margin and a high cure rate.

The cure rate with Mohs surgery cited by most studies is between 97% and 99.8% for primary basal-cell carcinoma, the most common type of skin cancer. Mohs procedure is also used for squamous cell carcinoma, but with a lower cure rate. Recurrent basal-cell cancer has a lower cure rate with Mohs surgery, more in the range of 94%. It has been used in the removal of melanoma-in-situ (cure rate 77% to 98% depending on surgeon), and certain types of melanoma (cure rate 52%).

Other indications for Mohs surgery include dermatofibrosarcoma protuberans, keratoacanthoma, spindle cell tumors, sebaceous carcinomas, microcystic adnexal carcinoma, merkel cell carcinoma, Paget's disease of the breast, atypical fibroxanthoma, and leiomyosarcoma. Because the Mohs procedure is micrographically controlled, it provides precise removal of the cancerous tissue, while healthy tissue is spared. Mohs surgery can also be more cost-effective than other surgical methods, when considering the cost of surgical removal and separate histopathological analysis. However, Mohs surgery should be reserved for the treatment of skin cancers in anatomic areas where tissue preservation is of utmost importance (face, neck, hands, lower legs, feet, genitals).

== Uses ==
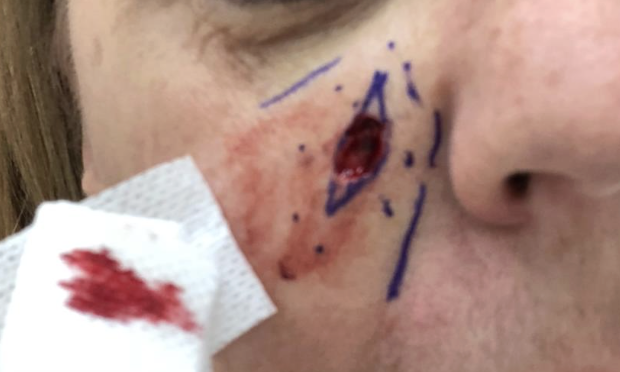
This image depicts a Mohs excision defect below the right eye after the patient was diagnosed with a basal cell carcinoma (biopsy-proven). The wound is left open while the patient awaits confirmation of clear margins from the Mohs surgeon.

Skin cancer can be categorized into two groups: melanoma, which is considered more severe, and nonmelanoma skin cancer, which includes basal cell carcinoma and cutaneous squamous cell carcinoma.

Mohs micrographic surgery is used for high-risk nonmelanoma skin cancers located in cosmetically critical or sensitive areas like the face, ears, scalp, neck, genitalia, hands, and feet, where tissue conservation is of utmost importance. It is also indicated when the tumor is recurrent, aggressive, large, or painful, which tells us there is invasion of the nerve or vasculature.

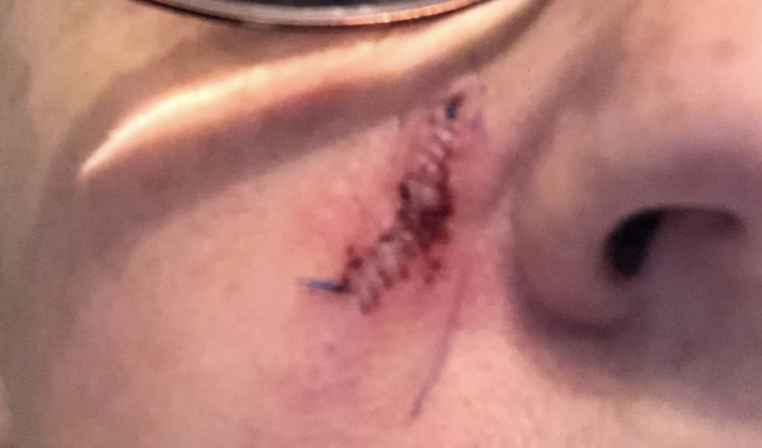
This image is showing the primary closure of the Mohs excision using sutures after confirmation that the margins are clear under microscopic evaluation by the Mohs surgeon.

Some cases of melanoma, such as early, surface-level melanoma (lentigo maligna) or thin invasive melanoma, can be treated with Mohs surgery. This is especially considered in areas where tissue sparing is essential. In these cases, special immunohistochemical staining is used to visualize the melanoma cells, evaluate the margins, and ensure the cancer has been completely removed. More evidence today is linking Mohs surgery with lower recurrence rates of melanoma in these cases.

This approach is also used in treating rare skin cancers. For example, dermatofibrosarcoma protuberans, a slow-growing cancer that begins in the deeper layers of the skin, as well as cancers arising from hair follicles, oil glands, or sweat glands, would benefit from Mohs surgery as these are cases where margin clearance is essential.

In summary, the Mohs micrographic surgery criteria are as follows:

- Recurrent or high-risk basal cell and cutaneous squamous cell carcinomas in anatomically or cosmetically sensitive areas.
- Specific cases of early-stage or surface-level melanoma (melanoma in situ or lentigo maligna), and thin invasive melanoma in similarly sensitive sites.
- Other rare skin cancers where all the margins need to be visualized.

== Contraindications ==
Mohs surgery is generally contraindicated when the criteria summarized in the “Uses” section above are not met. For example, the tumor is small, low-risk, has well-defined margins, and is in a non-critical area.

The standard protocol for Mohs surgery requires the surgeon to both remove the tissue and interpret the pathology. The procedure is not considered Mohs surgery if the removed tissue is sent and read by a pathologist instead of the surgeon performing the procedure. In this case, it is considered a standard excision and should be documented as such. Another doctor interpreting histopathology is incompatible with Mohs surgery.

Relative contraindications include instances where the risks of surgery outweigh the benefits such as in patients with co-morbidities, in cases where the defect caused by surgery would need complex reconstruction beyond the scope of the surgery, or when patient factors such as severe bleeding predispositions or being unable to tolerate local anesthesia would affect the prognosis.

Increased postoperative complications are associated with immunosuppressed patients (e.g. solid organ transplant recipients) and elderly patients. These are not absolute contraindications, but the risks of this procedure should be weighed against the benefits for each individual patient.

== Risks and complications ==
The overall risk of Mohs micrographic surgery complications is very low. Reported adverse event rates are between 0.7% and 2.6% according to large multi-center prospective studies. Infection of the surgical site, hematoma formation, bleeding, and suboptimal wound repair with dehiscence or ischemic necrosis are the most reported adverse events. Complication rates leading to permanent damage or requiring hospitalization are below 0.1% and no deaths have resulted from this procedure.

Certain patient factors may make complications more likely. These include immunosuppression (after an organ transplant) and use of anticoagulants or anti-platelets (“blood thinners”). Increased risk is not independently associated with older age. There are surgical characteristics which also may increase the risk of complications including cancer location (extremities vs. forehead), large tumors with depth, and tumors requiring advanced flap or graft repairs.

=== Specific risks/complications ===
- Infection: About 0.9-2.5% of patients who undergo Mohs surgery will develop an infection. This is the most frequently documented adverse event with higher rates in patients who are immunosuppressed. To reduce this risk, antiseptics and antibiotics may be used, but the absolute benefit is modest.
- Impaired wound healing: Dehiscence (partial reopening of the wound) and necrosis (death of healthy tissue) rates are approximately 1-2%. Risk factors include larger excisions, flap/graft use, and immunosuppressed patients. Complication rates decrease when the wound heals with primary closure (using stitches after surgery) or secondary intention (the wound is left open to heal naturally).
- Hematoma formation and bleeding: This is most commonly seen in patients on antiplatelet or anticoagulant therapy and occurs in 0.9-1.5% of cases. Despite this, patients are not routinely asked to stop these medications, as most experience no complications, and withdrawal is generally not justified.
- Scarring: 5-7% of cases, especially larger tumors and complex repairs, result in hypertrophic scarring.

Less commonly seen are postoperative swelling, rash, and disturbance of skin sensation. Pain is generally mild.

Overall, Mohs surgery is generally safe, with risks/complications being minor and manageable.

== Technique ==
Divided Mohs Section

Pacman 1 Piece

Double Pacman

In 2012, the American Academy of Dermatology published appropriate use criteria (AUC) on Mohs micrographic surgery in collaboration with the following organizations: American College of Mohs Surgery; American Society for Mohs Surgery; and the American Society for Dermatologic Surgery Association. More than 75 physicians contributed to the development of the Mohs surgery AUC, which were published in the Journal of the American Academy of Dermatology and Dermatologic Surgery.

The Australasian College of Dermatologists, in concert with the Australian Mohs Surgery Committee, has also developed evidence based guidelines for Mohs Surgery.

The Mohs procedure is a pathology sectioning method that allows for the complete examination of the surgical margin. It is different from the standard bread loafing technique of sectioning, where random samples of the surgical margin are examined.

Mohs surgery is performed in four steps:

- Surgical removal of tissue (Surgical Oncology)
- Mapping the piece of tissue, freezing and cutting the tissue between 5 and 10 micrometres using a cryostat, and staining with hematoxylin and eosin (H&E) or other stains (Including Toluidine Blue)
- Interpretation of microscope slides (Pathology)
- Possible reconstruction of the surgical defect (Reconstructive Surgery)

The procedure is usually performed in a physician's office under local anesthetic. A small scalpel is utilized to cut around the visible tumor. Unlike a normal surgical excision, a Mohs surgery cut is performed at a beveling between 10 and 45 degrees to allow visibility of all skin layers during pathological diagnosis. A very small surgical margin is utilized, usually with 1 to 1.5 mm of "free margin" or uninvolved skin. The amount of free margin removed is much less than the usual 4 to 6 mm required for the standard excision of skin cancers. After each surgical removal of tissue, the specimen is processed, cut on the cryostat and placed on slides, stained with H&E and then read by the Mohs surgeon/pathologist who examines the sections for cancerous cells. If cancer is found, its location is marked on the map (drawing of the tissue) and the surgeon removes the indicated cancerous tissue from the patient. This procedure is repeated until no further cancer is found. The vast majority of cases are then reconstructed by the Mohs surgeon. Some surgeons utilize 100 micrometres between each section, and some utilize 200 micrometres between the first two sections, and 100 micrometres between subsequent sections (10 crank of tissue set at 6 to 10 micrometre is roughly equal to 100 micrometres if one allows for physical compression due to the blade).

=== Blood thinners ===
The trend in skin surgery over the last 10 years has been to continue anticoagulants while performing skin surgery. Most cutaneous bleeding can be controlled with electrocautery, especially bipolar forceps. The benefit gained by ease of hemostasis is weighed against the risk of stopping anticoagulants; and it is generally preferred to continue anticoagulants.

== Recovery ==
A majority of patients generally report feeling minimal discomfort after Mohs surgery, with the most discomfort being reported the day of surgery and the day after. After the first two days, the pain steadily reduces over the next week. The surgery is overall well-tolerated and has a fast recovery. Many patients don’t require analgesics or pain medication, but of those who do, acetaminophen is usually enough to manage pain. Only a few go on to need a prescription pain medication. When multiple areas are operated on at once or when the scalp is involved, pain tends to be increased.

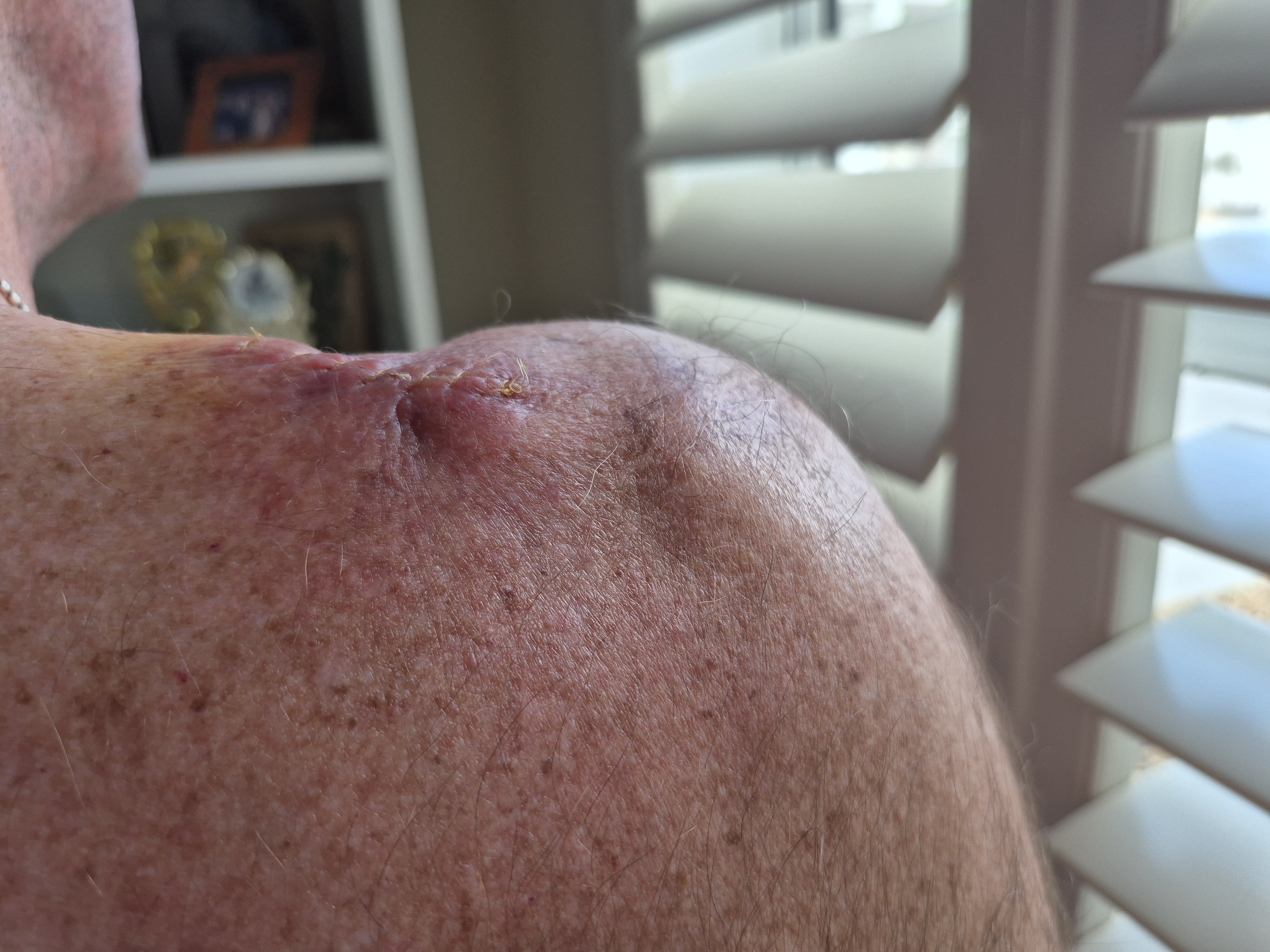
Shoulder of a 66-year-old man one week after Mohs micrographic surgery. The surgical site shows a linear closure with sutures still in place, mild surrounding erythema (redness), and early healing.

Gentle cleansing and coverage of the wound with antibiotic ointment or petrolatum is recommended until sutures are removed in instances of primary closure or local flap repairs. Depending on varying factors such as tension of the wound, anatomic site, and personal patient factors, this usually occurs 5-14 days after the operation. On the other hand, immobilization and non-adherent dressings may be required for skin grafts. This is more intensive postoperative care, and better outcomes in select locations, like on the nose or foot, are associated with delayed grafting.

For certain areas of the body, like the concave surface of the ear, secondary intention healing (SIH) may be the best option for healing as it is associated with good cosmetic outcomes and lower complications in the appropriate cases. SIH involves leaving the wound to heal naturally, by itself, with no intervention (including no stitches or grafts). The wound heals while the patient monitors for healthy tissue formation and keeps the area clean with dressing changes.

To reduce the risk of bleeding, patients are generally advised not to carry over 10 pounds of weight and avoid excessive physical activity for 2-3 days after the procedure. Minor complications (outlined above in the Risks and Complications section) rarely occur and patients are usually able to continue their normal activity within days of the operation.

== Cure rate ==
Skin cancers, especially high-risk basal cell carcinoma and squamous cell carcinoma, respond well to Mohs micrographic surgery, which has one of the highest cure rates for these types of cutaneous malignancies.

The 5-year recurrence rate is around 1-3.3% for primary BCC which is equivalent to a 96.7-99% cure rate. The 5-year recurrence rate is around 5.2-5.6% for recurrent BCC which is equivalent to a 94.4-94.8% cure rate; slightly lower than with primary BCC. These figures are supported by the most recent international and large cohort studies.

The 5-year recurrence rates are around 2.1% for primary and 5.2% for recurrent tumors of the aggressive or high-risk facial BCC category. In regards to SCC, cure rates are dependent on the skin cancer’s location and risk factors, however, they are overall similar to BCC cure rates.

Cure rates are seen to range from 97.8% to 99% for melanoma in situ at follow-up of 4 to 5 years with Mohs surgery. In regards to invasive melanoma of the proximal limbs and trunk, cure rates are near 99.86%.

To summarize, the primary BCC cure rate for Mohs surgery is approximately 97-99%, and the cure rate for recurrent BCC is around 94-95% with similar rates for other skin cancers.

=== Cure rate variation ===
Some of Mohs' data revealed a cure rate as low as 96%, but these were often very large tumors, previously treated by other modalities. Some authors claim that their 5-year cure rate for primary basal-cell cancer exceeded 99% while other noted more conservative cure rate of 97%. The quoted cure rate for Mohs surgery on previously treated basal-cell cancer is about 94%. Reasons for variations in the cure rate include the following.

1. Modern frozen section method. Frozen section histology does not give the added margin of safety by the cytotoxic Mohs paste, originally used by Mohs. This paste might have destroyed any residual cancer cells not detected by the pathologist.
2. Missing epidermal margins. Ideally, the Mohs section should include 100% of the epidermal margin, but greater than 95% is often accepted. Vigorous scrubbing, poorly controlled initial curettage, poor tissue health, technician's error, and surgeon's error can introduce areas missing epithelial margin. Some surgeons consider 70% epithelial margin acceptable, while others suggest 100% margin. In the ideal situation, 100% of the epithelial margin should be available to be reviewed on serial sectioning of the Mohs specimen.
3. Misreading of the pathology slide. It is difficult to differentiate between a small island of basal-cell carcinoma and a hair follicle structure. Many Mohs surgeons limit their tissue processing to include only 2 sections of tissue. This severely hampers their ability to determine if a structure is a hair follicle or a carcinoma. Two histologic sections can not fully distinguish these two nearly identical structures, and can lead to either "false negative" or "false positive" errors by either calling a section clear of tumor, or calling a section positive for tumor, respectively. Serial sectioning of the tumor is preferred by other surgeons. Surgeons who perform serial sectioning through the block of tissue (usually 100 micrometres apart) are assured of the contiguous nature of his tumor and the distance of the tumor from the surgical margin, and are familiarized with the nature of the tumor. Serial sectioning also makes it easier to work with three-dimensional tumor with margins that are difficult to compress.
4. Compression artifact, freezing artifact, cautery artifact, tissue folds, crush artifact from forceps, relaxing incision artifact, cartilage dropping out, fat compression, poor staining, dropping of tumor, etc. These can be introduced as the tumor is "flattened". Stain can run from the surgical edge, and stain the surgical margin – giving a false impression that the entire surgical margin is clear, when it is not. While some surgeons unfamiliar with the "whole piece" or "PacMan" methods of processing might suggest that multiple piece sectioning is better than one, in fact the more tissue sections are cut, the more artifacts in staining and tissue malformation will be introduced. It is imperative that the surgeon be fully familiar with tissue handling and processing; and not simply rely on a trained technologist to perform their sectioning.
5. Hard-to-see tumor in heavy inflammatory infiltrate. This can occur with squamous cell carcinoma, especially when complicated with local infection, or intrinsic lymphoproliferative disorders (chronic lymphocytic leukemia). Because of an abnormal peripheral blood profile, the response to inflammatory skin conditions in patients with myelomonocytic leukemia can have the appearance of atypical cells at sites of inflammation, confusing the Mohs surgeon.
6. Perineural spread, and benign changes simulating perineural spread. Tumor spreading along a nerve can be difficult to visualize, and sometime benign plasma cells can surround the nerve, simulating cancer.
7. Anatomical area that is difficult to cut and process. Examples would be the ear, and other three-dimensional structures like eyelids. The ability to make a scallop-shaped incision is increasingly difficult when the surgical surface is no longer a flat plane, but is a three-dimensional, rigid structure.
8. Recurrent skin cancer with multiple islands of recurrence. This can occur with either previous excision or after electrodesiccation and curettage. As these residual skin cancers are often bound in scar tissue and present in multiple locations in the scar of the previous surgical defect, they are no longer contiguous in nature. Some surgeons advocate the removal of the complete scar in the treatment of "recurrent" skin cancers. Others advocate removing only the island of local recurrence and leaving the previous surgical scar behind. The decision is often made depending on the location of the tumor and the goal of the patient and physician.
9. Unreported or underreported recurrence. Many patients do not return to the original surgeon to report a recurrence. The consulting surgeon on the repeat surgery may not inform the first surgeon of the recurrence. The time it takes for a recurrent tumor to be visible to the patient might be 5 or more years. Quoted "cure" rates must be looked upon with the understanding that a 5-year cure rate might not necessarily be correct. As basal-cell carcinoma is a very slowly progressing tumor, a 5-year no recurrence rate might not be adequate. A longer follow-up might be needed to detect a slow-growing tumor left in the surgical scar.
10. Poor training of the surgeon/pathologist/histotechnologist. While Mohs surgery is essentially a technical method of tissue handling and processing, the skill and training of the surgeon can greatly affect the outcome. Success requires a foundation of good tissue handling, good surgical skill, and hemostasis, based on the tissue processing and staining technique. A surgeon without a good histotechnologist does not have access to sufficiently high-quality information about the cancer, and a histotechnologist without a good surgeon can not produce quality slides. Originally, surgeons learned the procedure by spending a few hours to several months with Mohs or during their residencies. Today, many Mohs surgeons complete a fellowship after their dermatology residency, spending hundreds of hours observing and performing Mohs surgery under the careful supervision of highly experienced Mohs surgeons. This is the most comprehensive and thorough method of learning Mohs surgery. Others learn the technique in their dermatology residencies and through courses and preceptorships. It is highly encouraged that a physician interested in learning Mohs surgery should spend extended time observing, cutting, processing, and staining Mohs specimens. It is vital that the histotechnologist prepare high-quality slides. The histology block must be correctly mounted, cut, and stained the first time, as there is no second chance in Mohs histology. It is not a procedure that can be properly mastered in a short period of time.

=== Comparison to other modalities of treatment ===
Pictogram of complete circumferential peripheral and deep margin assessment or margin controlled histology

Pictogram of standard bread loafing histology

False negative in standard bread loafing histology

Comparing Mohs Method to Smashing an Aluminum Piepan

How a Mohs section is flattened with relaxing incisions

Mohs surgery is not suitable for all skin cancers.

Mohs micrographic surgery is the most reliable form of margin control; utilising a unique frozen section histology processing technique – allowing for the complete examination of 100% of the surgical margin. The method is unique in that it is a simple way to handle soft, hard-to-cut tissue. It is superior to serial bread loafing at a 0.1 mm interval for improved false negative error rate, requiring less time, tissue handling, and fewer glass slides mounted.

The clinical quotes for cure rate of Mohs surgery are from 97% to 99.8% after 5 years for newly diagnosed basal cell cancer, decreasing to 94% or less for recurrent basal cell cancer. Radiation oncologists quote cure rates from 90 to 95% for basal cell cancer less than 1 or 2 cm, and 85 to 90% for basal cell cancer larger than 1 or 2 cm. The Surgical excision cure rate varies from 90 to 95% for wide margins (4 to 6 mm) and small tumors, to as low as 70% for narrow margins and large tumors.

== Society and culture ==
Some commentators argue that skin cancer surgery, including Mohs surgery, is overutilised as rates of skin cancer surgery are increasing worldwide. It is unclear if this relates to higher rates of skin cancer, increased vigilance in diagnosis, and increased availability of the procedure, or patient and doctor preferences. The incidence of Mohs surgery increased significantly over the decade between 2004 and 2014. In a sample of 100 Mohs surgeries, the total cost ranged from US$474 to US$7,594, with the higher costs for hospital-based complex procedures. In Australia, the direct out of pocket cost to patients may vary from $0 to $4000. When the non-Mohs surgery is performed by multiple doctors including pathologists the costs may be increased further. This is especially true when the cancer is incompletely excised and requires repeat surgery.

== History ==
Originally, Mohs used a chemical paste (an escharotic agent) to cauterize and kill the tissue. It was made of zinc chloride and bloodroot (the root of the plant Sanguinaria canadensis, which contains the alkaloid sanguinarine). The original ingredients were 40.0 g Stibnite, 10.0 g Sanguinaria canadensis, and 34.5 ml of saturated zinc chloride solution.

This paste is similar to black salve or "Hoxsey's paste" (see Hoxsey Therapy), a fraudulent patent medicine, but its usage is different. Hoxsey used the paste for long periods, a harmful practice that was rapidly discredited. Mohs left the paste on the wound only overnight, and the following day, the cancer and surrounding skin would be anesthetized and the cancer removed. The specimen was then excised, and the tissue examined under the microscope. If cancer remained, more paste was applied, and the patient would return the following day. Later, local anesthetic and frozen section histopathology applied to fresh tissue allowed the procedure to be performed the same day, with less tissue destruction, and similar cure rate.

== See also ==
- American College of Mohs Surgery
