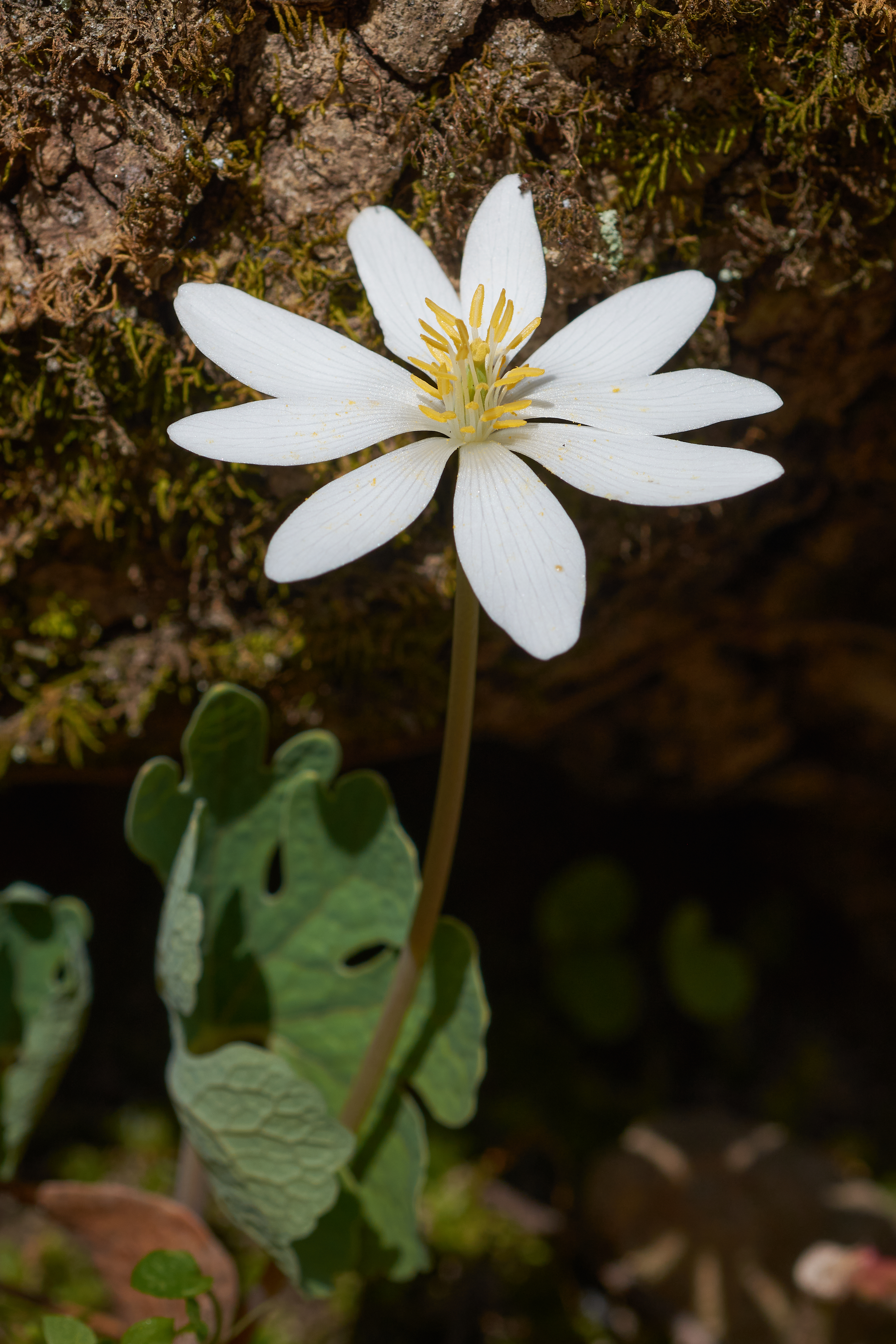

Conservation status
- Least Concern (IUCN 3.1)

- Secure (NatureServe)

Scientific classification
- Kingdom: Plantae
- Clade: Tracheophytes
- Clade: Angiosperms
- Clade: Eudicots
- Order: Ranunculales
- Family: Papaveraceae
- Subfamily: Papaveroideae
- Tribe: Chelidonieae
- Genus: Sanguinaria; L.
- Species: S. canadensis

Binomial name
- Sanguinaria canadensis L.

= Sanguinaria =

Genus of flowering plants in the poppy family Papaveraceae

Sanguinaria canadensis, bloodroot, is a perennial, herbaceous flowering plant native to eastern North America. It is the only species in the genus Sanguinaria, included in the poppy family Papaveraceae, and is most closely related to Eomecon of eastern Asia.

Sanguinaria canadensis is sometimes known as Canada puccoon, bloodwort, redroot, red puccoon, and black paste. Plants are variable in leaf and flower shape, and have been separated as a different subspecies due to these variable shapes, indicating a highly variable species.

In bloodroot, the sap is red and poisonous. Products made from sanguinaria extracts, such as black salve, are escharotic and can cause permanent disfiguring scarring. If applied to the skin, the extract sanguinarine may cause a massive scab of dead flesh where it killed the cells, called an eschar.

Although there are laboratory studies indicating that sanguinaria may have potential in cancer therapy, clinical studies are lacking, and use is not recommended due to significant off-target toxicity.

== Description ==
Bloodroot grows from 20 to 50 cm (8 to 20 in) tall. It has one large basal leaf, up to 25 cm (10 in) across, with five to seven lobes. The leaves and flowers sprout from a reddish rhizome with bright orange to red sap. The color of the sap is the reason for the genus name Sanguinaria, from Latin sanguinarius "bloody". The rhizomes grow longer each year, and branch to form colonies. Plants start to bloom before the foliage unfolds in early spring. After blooming, the leaves unfurl to their full size. Plants go dormant in mid to late summer, later than some other spring ephemerals.

The flowers bloom from March to May depending on the region and climate. They have 8–12 delicate white petals, many yellow stamens, and two sepals below the petals, which fall off after the flowers open. Each flower stem is clasped by a leaf as it emerges from the ground. The flowers open when they are in sunlight and close at night. They are pollinated by small bees and flies. Seeds develop in green pods 4 to 6 cm (1 1/2 to 2 1/4 in) long, and ripen before the foliage goes dormant. The seeds are round and black to orange-red when ripe, and have white elaiosomes, which are eaten by ants. The Latin specific epithet canadensis means of Canada.

Stages in the life of bloodroot

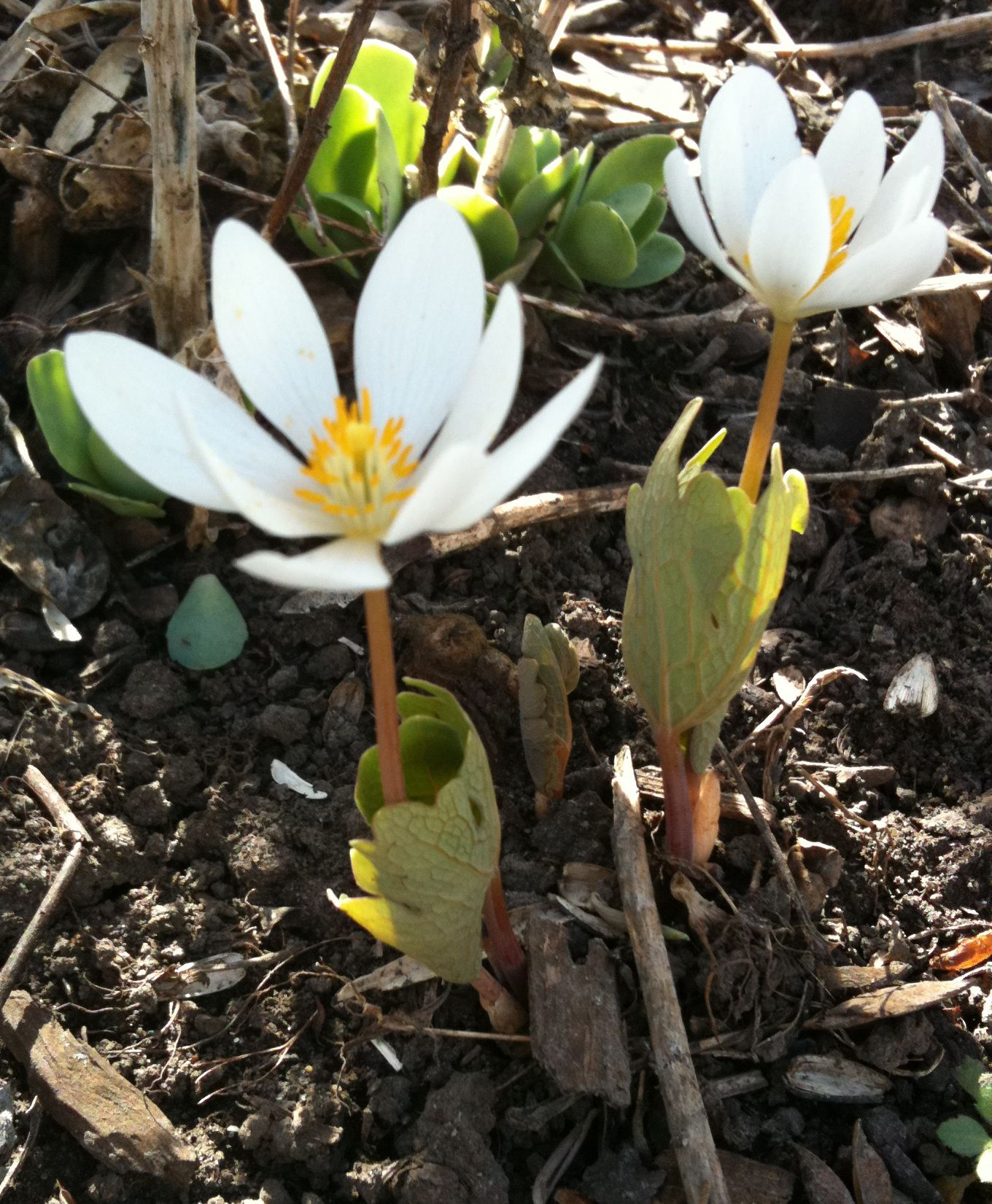
Leaves clasping the flower stems in early spring

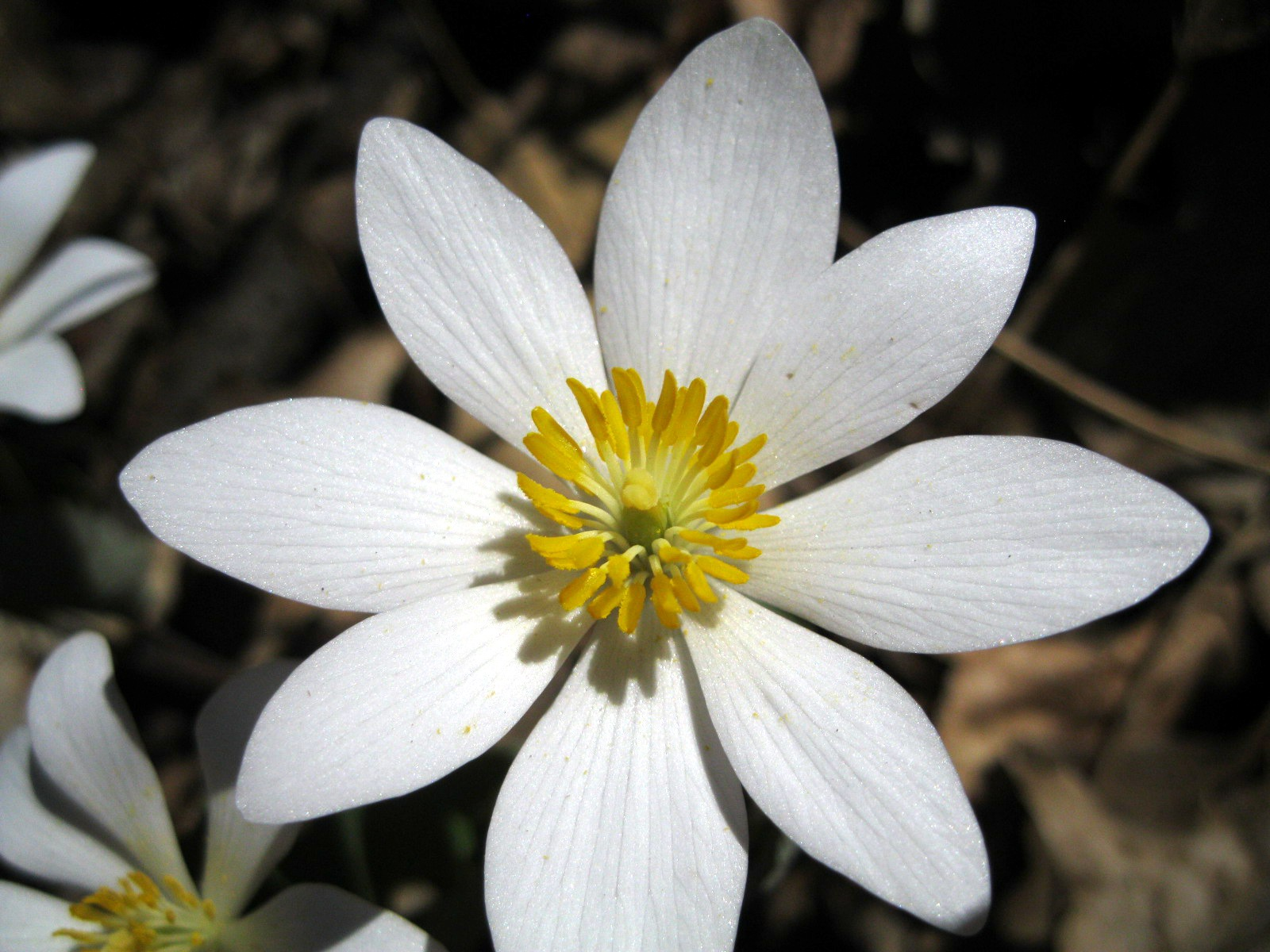
White petals and yellow stamens

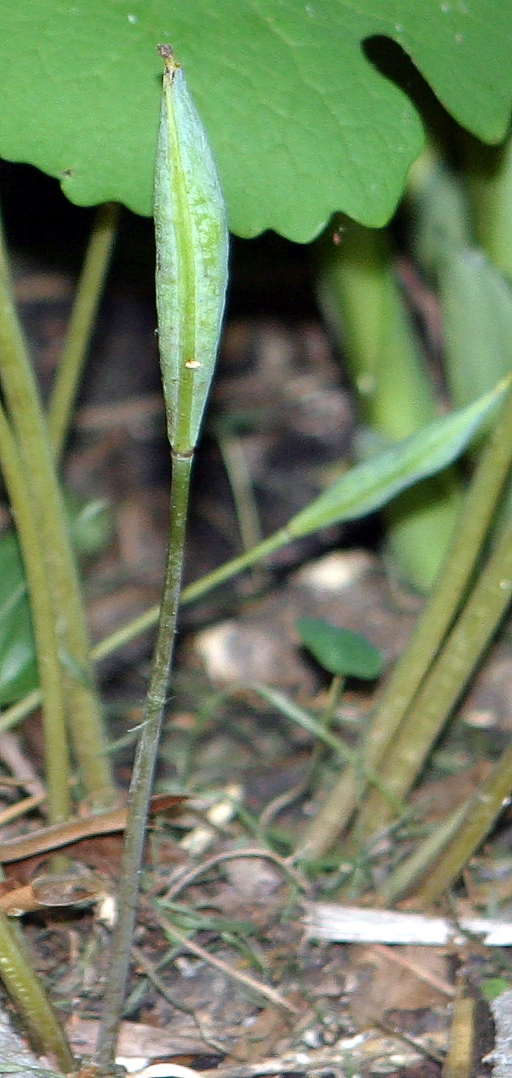
Fruit (a pod holding the seeds) in early summer

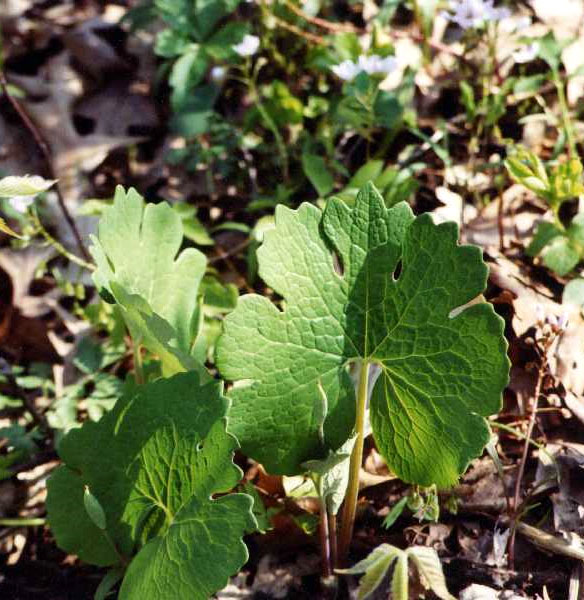
Leaves after flowering

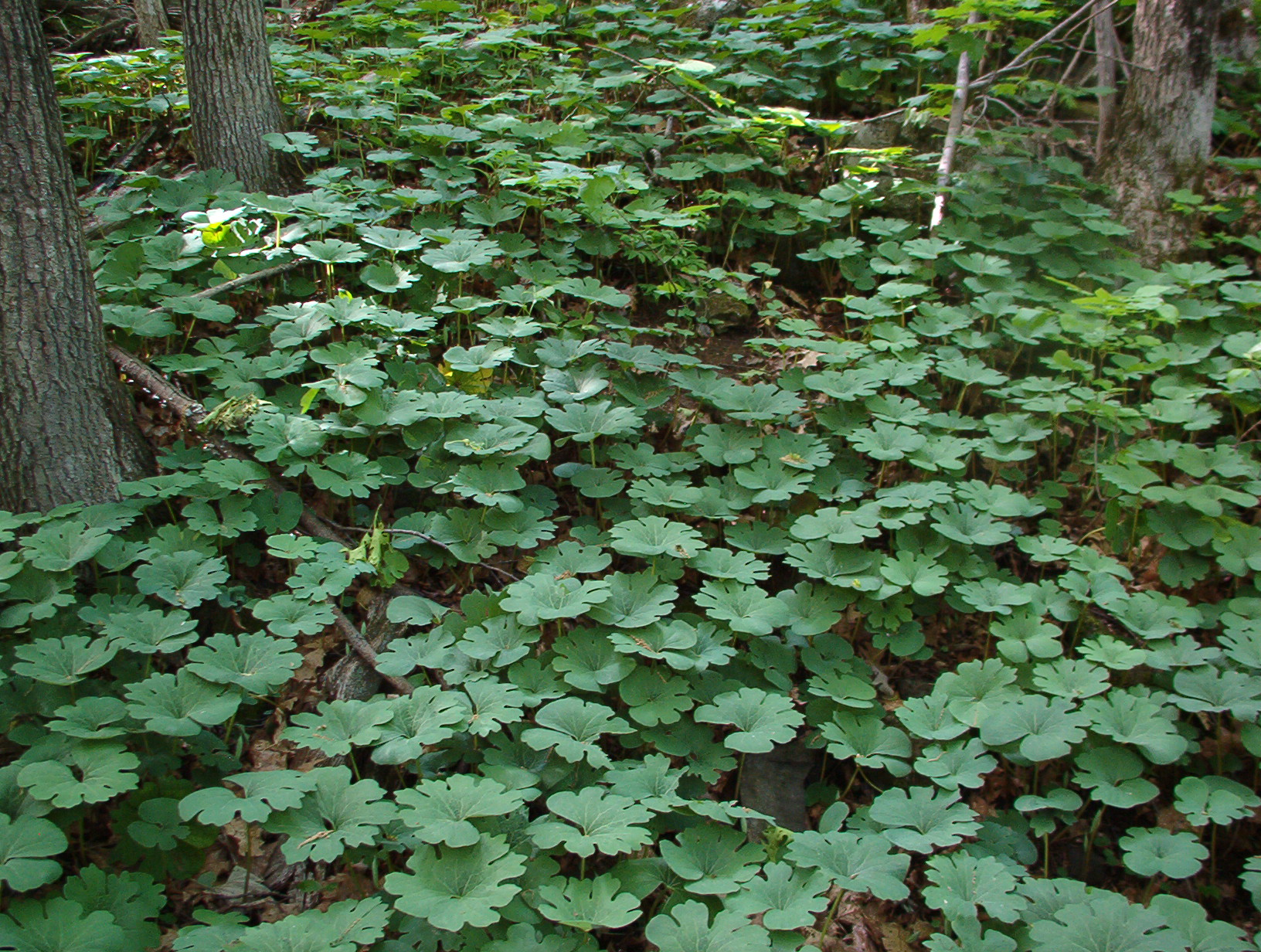
A carpet of leaves in late spring

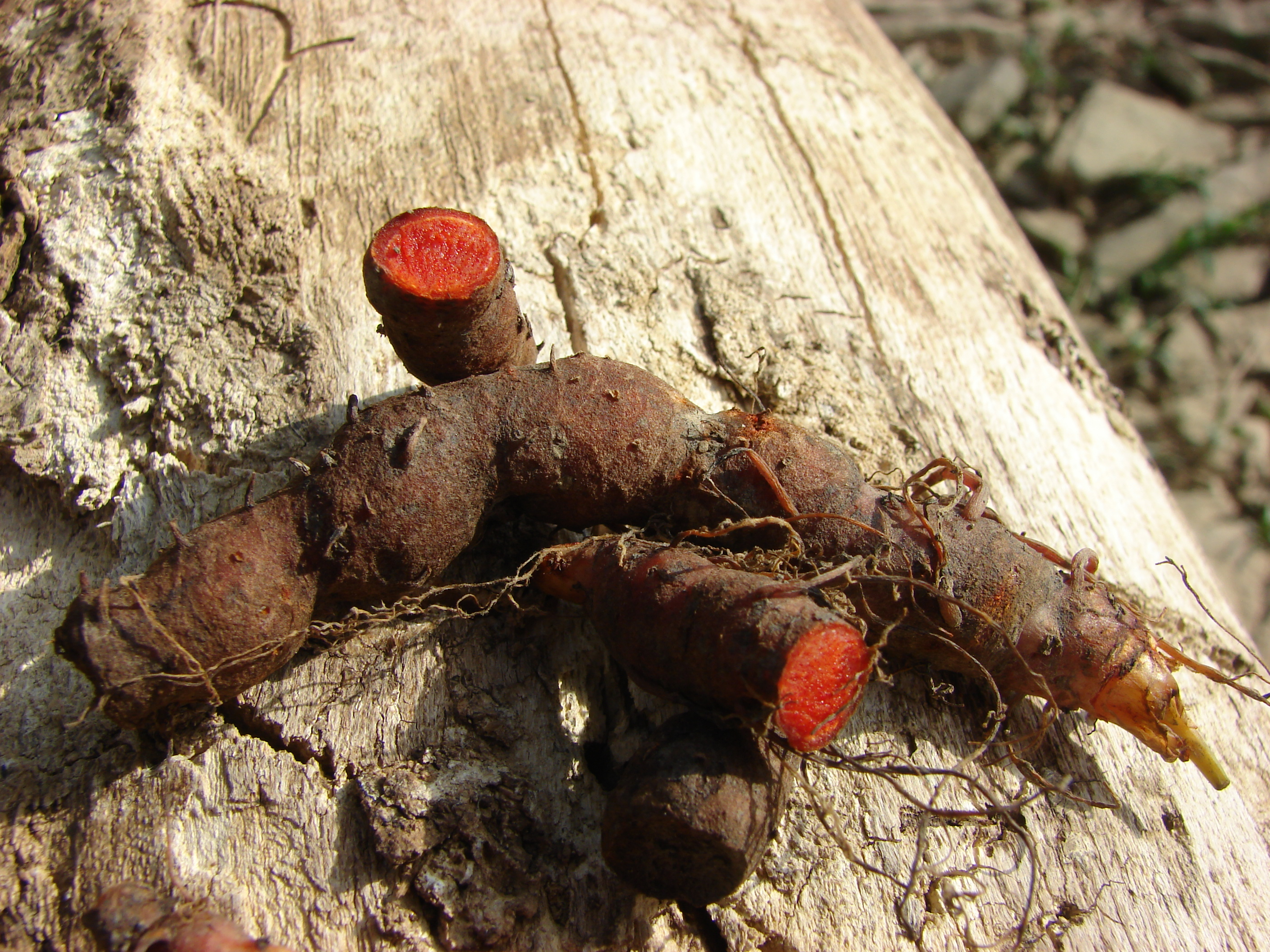
Rhizomes with orange flesh

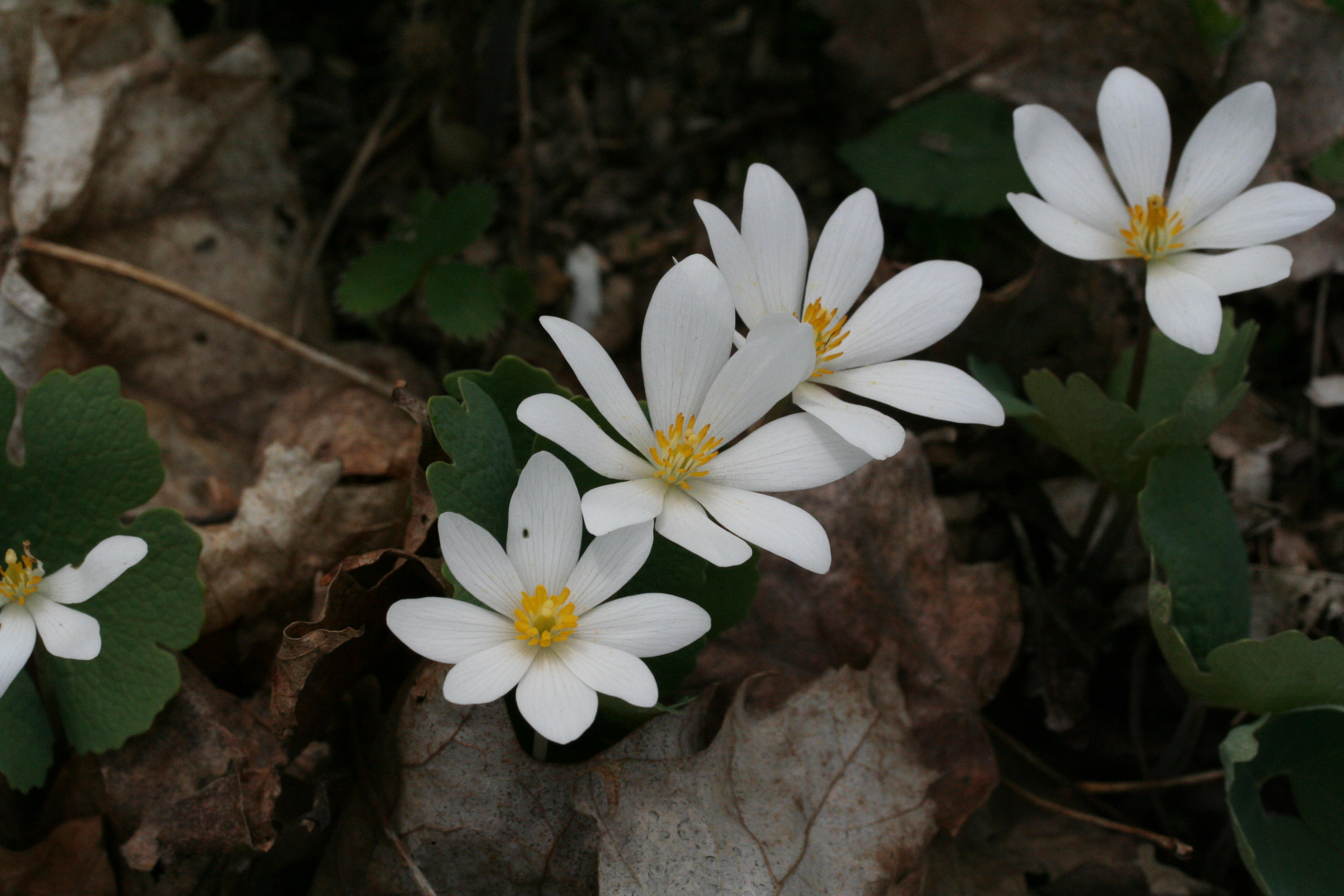
Sainte-Anne-de-la-Pérade Quebec, Canada

== Distribution and habitat ==
Bloodroot is native to eastern North America from Nova Scotia to Florida, and west to the Great Lakes and down the Mississippi embayment.

Sanguinaria canadensis grows in moist to dry woods and thickets, often on floodplains and near shores or streams on slopes. They grow less frequently in clearings and meadows or on dunes, and are rarely found in disturbed sites.

== Ecology ==
Bloodroot is one of many plants whose seeds are spread by ants, a process called myrmecochory. The seeds have a fleshy organ called an elaiosome that attracts ants. The ants take the seeds to their nest, where they eat the elaiosomes, and put the seeds in their nest debris, where they are protected until they germinate. They also benefit from growing in a medium made richer by the ant nest debris.

The flowers produce pollen, but no nectar. Various bees and flies visit the flowers looking in vain for nectar, for instance sweat bees in the genera Lasioglossum and Halictus, cuckoo bees in the genus Nomada, small carpenter bees (Ceratina), and bee flies in the genera Bombylius and Brachypalpus. Some insects visit the flowers to collect pollen, including mining bees (Andrena), which are the most effective pollinators, and at least one beetle species, Asclera ruficollis.

The bitter and toxic leaves and rhizomes are not often eaten by mammalian herbivores.

== Cultivation ==
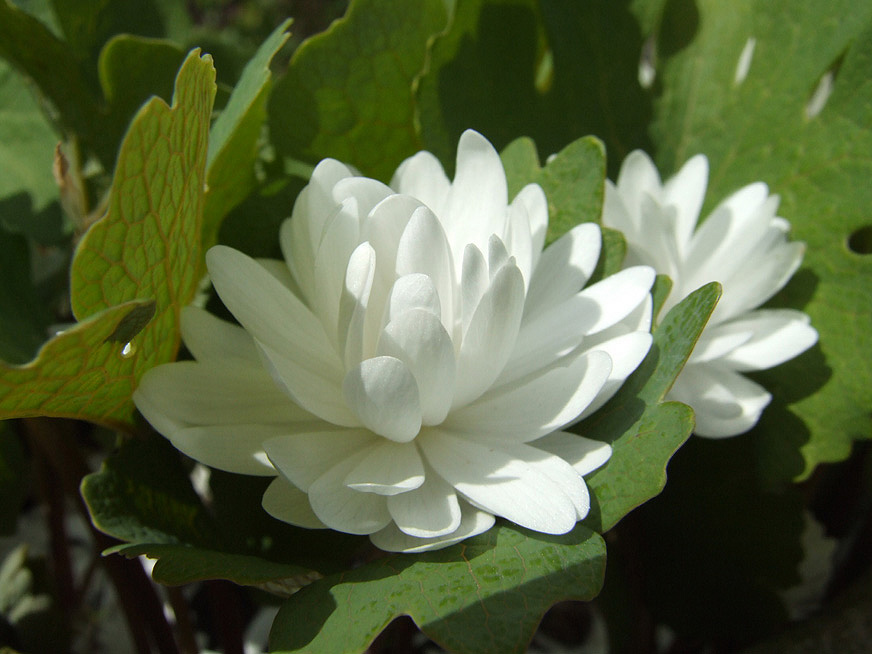
A double-flowered form

Sanguinaria canadensis is cultivated as an ornamental plant. The double-flowered forms are prized by gardeners for their large showy white flowers, which are produced very early in the gardening season. Bloodroot flower petals are shed within a day or two of pollination, so the flower display is short-lived, but the double forms bloom much longer than the normal forms. The double flowers are made up of stamens that have been changed into petal-like parts, making pollination more difficult.

The double-flowered cultivar S. canadensis f. multiplex 'Plena' has gained the Royal Horticultural Society's Award of Garden Merit.

== Phytochemicals ==
Sanguinaria root is rich in isoquinoline alkaloids, mainly sanguinarine and chelerythrine. Sanguinarine is a benzophenanthridine alkaloid (see phenanthridine), which, unlike most other alkaloids, has a red color in aqueous solutions. It is present in the greatest concentration in the rhizomes, and the second greatest in the roots, with lesser amounts found in leaves and flowers. Related compounds in the plant are berberine and protopine, among other minor alkaloids.

== Toxicity ==
Bloodroot produces benzylisoquinoline alkaloids, primarily the toxin sanguinarine. The alkaloids are transported to and stored in the rhizome.

Sanguinarine kills animal cells by blocking the action of Na^{+}/K^{+}-ATPase transmembrane proteins. As a result, applying bloodroot to the skin may destroy tissue and lead to the formation of necrotic tissue, called an eschar. Bloodroot and its extracts are thus considered escharotic. Although applying escharotic agents (including bloodroot) to the skin is sometimes promoted as a pseudoscientific home treatment for skin cancer, these attempts can be severely disfiguring. Salves, most notably black salve, derived from bloodroot do not remove tumors. Microscopic tumor deposits may remain after visible tumor tissue is burned away, and case reports have shown that in such instances tumor has recurred and/or metastasized.

Internal use is not recommended. An overdose of bloodroot extract can cause vomiting and loss of consciousness.

== Alkaloid biosynthesis ==
Comparing the biosynthesis of morphine and sanguinarine, the final intermediate in common is (S)-reticuline. A number of species in the Papaveraceae and Ranunculaceae, as well as plants in the genus Colchicum (family Colchicaceae) and genus Chondrodendron (family Menispermaceae), also produce such benzylisoquinoline alkaloids. Plant geneticists have identified and sequenced genes which encode the enzymes required for this production. One enzyme involved is N-methylcoclaurine 3'-monooxygenase, which produces (S)-3'-hydroxy-N-methylcoclaurine and mendococlaurine from (S)-N-methylcoclaurine.

== Uses ==
=== Traditional medicine ===
Bloodroot was used historically by Native Americans for curative properties as an emetic, respiratory aid, and other treatments.

=== Dietary supplement and warnings ===
Bloodroot extracts have also been promoted by some dietary supplement companies as a treatment or cure for cancer, but the U.S. Food and Drug Administration listed some of these products among its "187 Fake Cancer 'Cures' Consumers Should Avoid". Oral use of products containing bloodroot are strongly associated with the development of oral leukoplakia, which is a premalignant lesion that may develop into oral cancer, although one review disputed this finding. Viadent, a dental product containing bloodroot, was withdrawn from the North American market due to concerns about its potential to cause cancer.

=== Commercial uses ===
Commercial uses of sanguinarine and bloodroot extract include dental hygiene products. Some animal food additives sold and distributed in Europe contain sanguinarine and chelerythrine.

=== Plant dye ===
Bloodroot is a red natural dye used by Native American artists, especially among southeastern rivercane basketmakers. A break in the surface of the plant, especially the roots, reveals a reddish sap which can be used as a dye.

== Research ==
Although limited laboratory research indicates potential for sanguinarine to inhibit the growth of cancer cells, there are no supportive clinical studies, and its use is discouraged due to adverse effects and potential toxicity.

== See also ==
- Orange-root
