= Greg Caton =

American businessman

Gregory James Caton
- Born: April 6, 1956
- Died: December 15, 2021 (aged 65); Guayaquil, Ecuador
- Other name: James Carr
- Education: Los Angeles Valley College (AA)
- Known for: Health care fraud, alternative medicine promotion
- Call sign: N5OY
- Website: Gregcaton.com

Gregory James Caton (April 6, 1956 – December 15, 2021) was an American businessman, inventor, manufacturer, and promoter of various herbal products, the main one being Cansema, which Caton claimed cures skin cancer, although the U.S. Food and Drug Administration (FDA) banned it in 2003 as worthless. Caton was the founder of Alpha Omega Labs, a manufacturer of natural health care products, that currently distributes internationally from Guayaquil, Ecuador.

== Early life and education ==
Caton was an avid amateur and short wave radio operator.

== First businesses ==
Caton founded Consumer Express in 1984. which later became Nutrition for Life, a multi-level marketing (MLM) company. The firm traded briefly on the NASDAQ stock exchange.

Nutrition for Life entered into a business agreement with Kevin Trudeau. After the change of ownership of Consumer Express, Caton wrote a book (which was since withdrawn) on his version of the alleged fraud surrounding this transaction. Down-Line News reviewed this work in February 1993 on their website. Caton filed a suit against Kevin Trudeau in the US Fifth District Court of Appeals, in response to a libel suit by Trudeau in 1996 over Caton's aforementioned book.

In January 1996, Kevin Trudeau filed a libel suit against Caton in Illinois state court based on statements Caton made in a book and on an Internet website. Caton removed the action to federal court, but on Trudeau's motion, the action was remanded. Thereafter, Caton failed to respond to Trudeau's claims and the court entered a default and noticed an evidential hearing. On June 5, 1996, after a hearing, the court rendered a default judgment against Caton, awarding Trudeau $5 million in compensatory damages and $5 million in punitive damages.

In November 1996, Caton filed for Chapter 7 bankruptcy in response to the judgment. Shortly afterward, the company was subject to a class action lawsuit filed in Harris County, Texas. Nutrition for Life filed for Chapter 7 bankruptcy on July 8, 2003.

Caton then took up a project to detail the issues associated with multi-level marketing on a site entitled MLM Credit Bureau. He was featured in an online article by Ami Mills on the Metroactive website in 1996 regarding his work.

== Lumen Foods, Alpha Omega Labs and Herbologics ==
Caton started Alpha Omega Labs in 1995 using the pseudonym "James Carr". Alpha Omega Labs became a provider of over 300 alternative health products with 14 distributors around the world, before its closure by the U.S. Food and Drug Administration (FDA) in 2003. Caton pleaded guilty to charges that he defrauded consumers.

In early 2000, Lumen Foods reportedly "broke ranks" with the health food industry when it was reported that it would actively include Genetically modified organism (GMO) products in its offerings.

"They have it all wrong", said Lumen Foods' President, Greg Caton. "FDA, USDA, and EPA have all done exhaustive research into their safety and have found nothing that remotely suggests that either the consumer or the environment are at risk from GM seed", he said.

This earned significant attention from non-GMO advocates. Caton spoke at Cornell University's sponsored symposium, Informing the Dialogue about Agricultural Biotechnology, in November 1999. His topic was GMO Controversy & the Whole Foods Industry: Why Wholesale Condemnation of Agricultural Biotechnology Hurts our Most Ingredient-Sensitive Markets Lumen Foods reversed their position later in the year, supposedly from pressure by their customers.

Alpha Omega was the topic of an exposé by Business Week in their review of the book Natural Causes. The review in Business Week references the case of Sue Gilliatt, a nurse from Indianapolis who claimed she used Cansema, as well as a product named "H3O" (also sold by Caton) for skin cancer on her nose and that they burned off her nose (in the lawsuit, H3O was primarily blamed). Caton contested Gilliatt's assertions, claiming that because of the individual's use of additional alternative medicine, exclusive attribution of damages from H3O could not be determined. Furthermore, according to Caton, Gilliatt contradicted herself several times in her various court testimonies. Caton even claims that Gilliatt's nose appears to have been surgically removed, citing photographs. The use of escharotics (caustic pastes) such as Cansema to treat skin cancer is "unproven" and can have "serious consequences", according to dermatologists.

== Federal conviction ==
In 2003, United States Federal agents from the joint task force (including U.S. FDA, Bureau of Alcohol, Tobacco and Firearms and local law enforcement) raided Caton's offices, factory and home. As a result of the raid, Caton pleaded guilty in 2004 and was sentenced to 33 months in prison for weapons possession by a felon, and for defrauding customers and violating FDA regulations. Caton had received a previous felony conviction for counterfeiting in 1990.

Caton filed for a writ of habeas corpus based upon ineffective counsel in 2005. This was denied with prejudice by the courts.

== Probation violation and extradition from Ecuador ==
On 5 June 2006, after serving his sentence, Greg Caton was released on three years probation with specific restrictions against possession of firearms or manufacture of non-FDA approved materials. He and his family relocated to Ecuador in the summer of 2007. Alpha Omega Labs were reopened in June 2008.

On 27 October 2007, Caton was found in violation of the terms of his probation. In September 2008, a filing was made with the U.S. patent office in which he expressed a fear of arrest for violation of his probation, if he returned to the US.

Caton's probation violation was reported to Interpol, and was placed in their database; it was reported on Interpol website on 30 September 2008. In February 2009, he was featured in Parade Magazine's "On the Run In America" as an Interpol international fugitive.

On 3 December 2009, Caton was arrested at a checkpoint in Ecuador and held in prison. What followed was a complex set of legal manoeuvres involving multiple parties. According to vague reports by Cathryn Caton, his wife, these maneuvers included various members of the Ecuadorian judiciary and police officials. A judicial hearing on the case was scheduled in Guayaquil, Ecuador on 14 December 2009.

Caton was sentenced in a Louisiana court in May 2010 to serve the remainder of his probation (24 months) in prison. He filed a motion of appeal on June 23, 2011, under the provision that the court failed to consider sentencing guidelines. This appeal was denied.

== Later life ==
Caton returned to Ecuador and continued selling his products online. An interview in November 2016 on the One Radio Network podcast detailed his view of medical practice and the purported benefits from black salve. The well-known television physician Dr. Mehmet Oz conducted an investigation into black salve, culminating in an interview with Caton. Caton died on 15 December 2021 of a heart attack.

== Authored works ==
- Caton, G.J.; Lumen: Food For A New Age, Calcasieu Graphics & Pressworks, 1986. ISBN 0-939955-00-8
- Caton, Greg; MLM Fraud: A Practical Handbook for the Network Marketing Professional, (self-published), 1990. ISBN 0-939955-03-2
