= N-methylcoclaurine 3'-monooxygenase =

Class of enzymes

Identifiers
- EC no.: 1.14.13.71

Databases
- IntEnz: IntEnz view
- BRENDA: BRENDA entry
- ExPASy: NiceZyme view
- KEGG: KEGG entry
- MetaCyc: metabolic pathway
- PRIAM: profile
- PDB structures: RCSB PDB PDBe PDBsum
- Gene Ontology: AmiGO / QuickGO
Search
- PMC: articles
- PubMed: articles
- NCBI: proteins

In enzymology, a N-methylcoclaurine 3'-monooxygenase (EC 1.14.13.71) is an enzyme that catalyzes the chemical reaction

(S)-N-methylcoclaurine + NADPH + H^{+} + O_{2} $\rightleftharpoons$ (S)-3'-hydroxy-N-methylcoclaurine + NADP^{+} + H_{2}O

The 4 substrates of this enzyme are (S)-N-methylcoclaurine, NADPH, H^{+}, and O_{2}, whereas its 3 products are (S)-3'-hydroxy-N-methylcoclaurine, NADP^{+}, and H_{2}O.

This enzyme belongs to the family of oxidoreductases, specifically those acting on paired donors, with O_{2} as oxidant and incorporation or reduction of oxygen. The oxygen incorporated need not be derived from O_{2} with NADH or NADPH as one donor, and incorporation of one atom of oxygen into the other donor. The systematic name of this enzyme class is (S)-N-methylcoclaurine,NADPH:oxygen oxidoreductase (3'-hydroxylating). This enzyme is also called N-methylcoclaurine 3'-hydroxylase and CYP80B1.
