= Frederic E. Mohs =

American physician (1910–2002)

Frederic Edward Mohs
- Mohs in 1977
- Born: March 1, 1910; Burlington, Wisconsin
- Died: July 2, 2002 (aged 92)
- Education: University of Wisconsin–Madison
- Known for: Mohs surgery
- Medical career
- Profession: Surgeon
- Institutions: University of Wisconsin–Madison

Frederic Edward Mohs (March 1, 1910 – July 2, 2002) was an American physician and general surgeon who developed the Mohs micrographic surgery (MMS) technique in 1938 to remove skin cancer lesions while still a medical student at the University of Wisconsin–Madison. The Mohs procedure is considered the best method for treating certain types of skin cancer, because it has very high cure rates for even high-risk lesions, combined with maximal preservation of healthy tissues.

== Early life ==
Mohs was born in Burlington, Wisconsin. His father died when he was 3 months old. The family then moved to Madison, where his mother ran a boarding house. After initially considering a career as a radio engineer, he switched to medical studies in college.

== Medical career ==
Mohs began developing his treatment in the 1930s, experimenting on rats and other animals. The breakthrough came when he discovered that applying a combination zinc chloride and bloodroot paste to malignant rat skin tissue allowed it to be removed surgically and examined under a microscope. He treated his first human patient on June 23, 1936. Mohs spent his working life at the University of Wisconsin.

Mohs first tried to publish his findings and encouraged surgeons to learn the procedure. This was largely unsuccessful, as many surgeons were not comfortable learning skin pathology and laboratory techniques. Dermatologists, who are well trained in dermatopathology, and who treat skin cancers on a daily basis, quickly embraced the procedure. Today, most Mohs procedures are performed by dermatologists, although a small number of plastic surgeons, otolaryngologists, and pathologists are also practicing and using the procedure as well.

Mohs' technique was later modified by Perry Robins in the 1970s, using fresh-tissue frozen histology. Rather than using the anesthetic Mohs paste, local anesthetic is used. The fresh skin specimen is then mounted on a cryostat, and frozen sections are examined instead of the Mohs paste-fixed sections. This method is now commonly referred to as Mohs surgery, and occasionally chemosurgery, in reference to the Mohs paste initially used.

== Personal life ==
In 1943, Mohs married Mary Ellen Reynolds, who died in 1995. Mohs died at his home in Madison, Wisconsin on July 2, 2002, aged 92. He was survived by two sons, Frederic and Thomas, and a daughter, Jane Schimming.
